

65001–65100 

|-bgcolor=#d6d6d6
| 65001 Teodorescu ||  ||  || January 9, 2002 || Campo Imperatore || F. Bernardi, A. Boattini || — || align=right | 4.7 km || 
|-id=002 bgcolor=#fefefe
| 65002 ||  || — || January 8, 2002 || Socorro || LINEAR || FLO || align=right | 2.6 km || 
|-id=003 bgcolor=#d6d6d6
| 65003 ||  || — || January 8, 2002 || Socorro || LINEAR || — || align=right | 4.2 km || 
|-id=004 bgcolor=#fefefe
| 65004 ||  || — || January 8, 2002 || Socorro || LINEAR || NYS || align=right | 1.7 km || 
|-id=005 bgcolor=#d6d6d6
| 65005 ||  || — || January 8, 2002 || Socorro || LINEAR || — || align=right | 4.7 km || 
|-id=006 bgcolor=#E9E9E9
| 65006 ||  || — || January 8, 2002 || Socorro || LINEAR || — || align=right | 3.0 km || 
|-id=007 bgcolor=#d6d6d6
| 65007 ||  || — || January 9, 2002 || Socorro || LINEAR || — || align=right | 6.2 km || 
|-id=008 bgcolor=#E9E9E9
| 65008 ||  || — || January 9, 2002 || Socorro || LINEAR || — || align=right | 2.6 km || 
|-id=009 bgcolor=#E9E9E9
| 65009 ||  || — || January 9, 2002 || Socorro || LINEAR || AER || align=right | 2.7 km || 
|-id=010 bgcolor=#fefefe
| 65010 ||  || — || January 9, 2002 || Socorro || LINEAR || — || align=right | 1.4 km || 
|-id=011 bgcolor=#E9E9E9
| 65011 ||  || — || January 9, 2002 || Socorro || LINEAR || GEF || align=right | 3.0 km || 
|-id=012 bgcolor=#fefefe
| 65012 ||  || — || January 9, 2002 || Socorro || LINEAR || — || align=right | 2.7 km || 
|-id=013 bgcolor=#d6d6d6
| 65013 ||  || — || January 9, 2002 || Socorro || LINEAR || HYG || align=right | 6.9 km || 
|-id=014 bgcolor=#E9E9E9
| 65014 ||  || — || January 9, 2002 || Socorro || LINEAR || — || align=right | 4.9 km || 
|-id=015 bgcolor=#d6d6d6
| 65015 ||  || — || January 9, 2002 || Socorro || LINEAR || HYG || align=right | 5.6 km || 
|-id=016 bgcolor=#d6d6d6
| 65016 ||  || — || January 9, 2002 || Socorro || LINEAR || CHA || align=right | 4.2 km || 
|-id=017 bgcolor=#d6d6d6
| 65017 ||  || — || January 8, 2002 || Socorro || LINEAR || — || align=right | 3.6 km || 
|-id=018 bgcolor=#E9E9E9
| 65018 ||  || — || January 8, 2002 || Socorro || LINEAR || — || align=right | 1.7 km || 
|-id=019 bgcolor=#d6d6d6
| 65019 ||  || — || January 8, 2002 || Socorro || LINEAR || — || align=right | 4.2 km || 
|-id=020 bgcolor=#d6d6d6
| 65020 ||  || — || January 8, 2002 || Socorro || LINEAR || — || align=right | 7.9 km || 
|-id=021 bgcolor=#d6d6d6
| 65021 ||  || — || January 9, 2002 || Socorro || LINEAR || — || align=right | 4.6 km || 
|-id=022 bgcolor=#d6d6d6
| 65022 ||  || — || January 9, 2002 || Socorro || LINEAR || — || align=right | 4.9 km || 
|-id=023 bgcolor=#d6d6d6
| 65023 ||  || — || January 9, 2002 || Socorro || LINEAR || THM || align=right | 4.1 km || 
|-id=024 bgcolor=#E9E9E9
| 65024 ||  || — || January 9, 2002 || Socorro || LINEAR || — || align=right | 5.4 km || 
|-id=025 bgcolor=#d6d6d6
| 65025 ||  || — || January 9, 2002 || Socorro || LINEAR || — || align=right | 6.4 km || 
|-id=026 bgcolor=#d6d6d6
| 65026 ||  || — || January 9, 2002 || Socorro || LINEAR || — || align=right | 5.1 km || 
|-id=027 bgcolor=#fefefe
| 65027 ||  || — || January 9, 2002 || Socorro || LINEAR || — || align=right | 2.3 km || 
|-id=028 bgcolor=#d6d6d6
| 65028 ||  || — || January 9, 2002 || Socorro || LINEAR || EOS || align=right | 4.0 km || 
|-id=029 bgcolor=#d6d6d6
| 65029 ||  || — || January 9, 2002 || Socorro || LINEAR || HYG || align=right | 6.6 km || 
|-id=030 bgcolor=#d6d6d6
| 65030 ||  || — || January 9, 2002 || Socorro || LINEAR || — || align=right | 4.4 km || 
|-id=031 bgcolor=#E9E9E9
| 65031 ||  || — || January 9, 2002 || Socorro || LINEAR || — || align=right | 4.4 km || 
|-id=032 bgcolor=#E9E9E9
| 65032 ||  || — || January 9, 2002 || Socorro || LINEAR || — || align=right | 2.9 km || 
|-id=033 bgcolor=#fefefe
| 65033 ||  || — || January 9, 2002 || Socorro || LINEAR || NYS || align=right | 1.8 km || 
|-id=034 bgcolor=#fefefe
| 65034 ||  || — || January 9, 2002 || Socorro || LINEAR || — || align=right | 2.2 km || 
|-id=035 bgcolor=#d6d6d6
| 65035 ||  || — || January 9, 2002 || Socorro || LINEAR || EOS || align=right | 3.5 km || 
|-id=036 bgcolor=#d6d6d6
| 65036 ||  || — || January 9, 2002 || Socorro || LINEAR || THM || align=right | 7.8 km || 
|-id=037 bgcolor=#fefefe
| 65037 ||  || — || January 9, 2002 || Socorro || LINEAR || — || align=right | 1.5 km || 
|-id=038 bgcolor=#fefefe
| 65038 ||  || — || January 14, 2002 || Desert Eagle || W. K. Y. Yeung || — || align=right | 2.5 km || 
|-id=039 bgcolor=#d6d6d6
| 65039 ||  || — || January 14, 2002 || Desert Eagle || W. K. Y. Yeung || — || align=right | 6.6 km || 
|-id=040 bgcolor=#fefefe
| 65040 ||  || — || January 8, 2002 || Socorro || LINEAR || — || align=right | 2.8 km || 
|-id=041 bgcolor=#E9E9E9
| 65041 ||  || — || January 9, 2002 || Socorro || LINEAR || — || align=right | 6.3 km || 
|-id=042 bgcolor=#d6d6d6
| 65042 ||  || — || January 9, 2002 || Socorro || LINEAR || KOR || align=right | 3.1 km || 
|-id=043 bgcolor=#d6d6d6
| 65043 ||  || — || January 9, 2002 || Socorro || LINEAR || — || align=right | 4.2 km || 
|-id=044 bgcolor=#d6d6d6
| 65044 ||  || — || January 9, 2002 || Socorro || LINEAR || — || align=right | 6.0 km || 
|-id=045 bgcolor=#E9E9E9
| 65045 ||  || — || January 13, 2002 || Socorro || LINEAR || — || align=right | 1.7 km || 
|-id=046 bgcolor=#E9E9E9
| 65046 ||  || — || January 13, 2002 || Palomar || NEAT || — || align=right | 2.4 km || 
|-id=047 bgcolor=#fefefe
| 65047 ||  || — || January 14, 2002 || Socorro || LINEAR || — || align=right | 2.3 km || 
|-id=048 bgcolor=#fefefe
| 65048 ||  || — || January 14, 2002 || Socorro || LINEAR || — || align=right | 1.5 km || 
|-id=049 bgcolor=#d6d6d6
| 65049 ||  || — || January 14, 2002 || Socorro || LINEAR || KOR || align=right | 2.9 km || 
|-id=050 bgcolor=#fefefe
| 65050 ||  || — || January 14, 2002 || Socorro || LINEAR || NYS || align=right | 4.6 km || 
|-id=051 bgcolor=#E9E9E9
| 65051 ||  || — || January 13, 2002 || Socorro || LINEAR || AGN || align=right | 2.9 km || 
|-id=052 bgcolor=#E9E9E9
| 65052 ||  || — || January 13, 2002 || Socorro || LINEAR || — || align=right | 4.1 km || 
|-id=053 bgcolor=#d6d6d6
| 65053 ||  || — || January 13, 2002 || Socorro || LINEAR || — || align=right | 5.8 km || 
|-id=054 bgcolor=#fefefe
| 65054 ||  || — || January 14, 2002 || Socorro || LINEAR || — || align=right | 4.4 km || 
|-id=055 bgcolor=#d6d6d6
| 65055 ||  || — || January 14, 2002 || Socorro || LINEAR || — || align=right | 3.2 km || 
|-id=056 bgcolor=#E9E9E9
| 65056 ||  || — || January 14, 2002 || Socorro || LINEAR || AGN || align=right | 2.5 km || 
|-id=057 bgcolor=#fefefe
| 65057 ||  || — || January 14, 2002 || Socorro || LINEAR || — || align=right | 1.6 km || 
|-id=058 bgcolor=#d6d6d6
| 65058 ||  || — || January 14, 2002 || Socorro || LINEAR || EOS || align=right | 4.5 km || 
|-id=059 bgcolor=#E9E9E9
| 65059 ||  || — || January 14, 2002 || Socorro || LINEAR || AGN || align=right | 3.1 km || 
|-id=060 bgcolor=#d6d6d6
| 65060 ||  || — || January 14, 2002 || Socorro || LINEAR || — || align=right | 3.3 km || 
|-id=061 bgcolor=#d6d6d6
| 65061 ||  || — || January 14, 2002 || Socorro || LINEAR || — || align=right | 5.2 km || 
|-id=062 bgcolor=#E9E9E9
| 65062 ||  || — || January 5, 2002 || Palomar || NEAT || — || align=right | 5.5 km || 
|-id=063 bgcolor=#d6d6d6
| 65063 ||  || — || January 5, 2002 || Palomar || NEAT || — || align=right | 6.6 km || 
|-id=064 bgcolor=#E9E9E9
| 65064 ||  || — || January 6, 2002 || Socorro || LINEAR || — || align=right | 3.7 km || 
|-id=065 bgcolor=#d6d6d6
| 65065 ||  || — || January 7, 2002 || Anderson Mesa || LONEOS || — || align=right | 5.6 km || 
|-id=066 bgcolor=#fefefe
| 65066 ||  || — || January 8, 2002 || Socorro || LINEAR || V || align=right | 1.9 km || 
|-id=067 bgcolor=#d6d6d6
| 65067 ||  || — || January 8, 2002 || Socorro || LINEAR || — || align=right | 5.7 km || 
|-id=068 bgcolor=#fefefe
| 65068 ||  || — || January 8, 2002 || Socorro || LINEAR || V || align=right | 1.7 km || 
|-id=069 bgcolor=#E9E9E9
| 65069 ||  || — || January 8, 2002 || Socorro || LINEAR || GEF || align=right | 2.8 km || 
|-id=070 bgcolor=#fefefe
| 65070 ||  || — || January 8, 2002 || Socorro || LINEAR || — || align=right | 2.9 km || 
|-id=071 bgcolor=#d6d6d6
| 65071 ||  || — || January 9, 2002 || Palomar || NEAT || — || align=right | 9.2 km || 
|-id=072 bgcolor=#E9E9E9
| 65072 ||  || — || January 10, 2002 || Palomar || NEAT || — || align=right | 6.3 km || 
|-id=073 bgcolor=#d6d6d6
| 65073 ||  || — || January 10, 2002 || Palomar || NEAT || — || align=right | 6.3 km || 
|-id=074 bgcolor=#E9E9E9
| 65074 ||  || — || January 10, 2002 || Palomar || NEAT || — || align=right | 3.8 km || 
|-id=075 bgcolor=#fefefe
| 65075 ||  || — || January 12, 2002 || Kitt Peak || Spacewatch || V || align=right | 1.5 km || 
|-id=076 bgcolor=#d6d6d6
| 65076 ||  || — || January 8, 2002 || Socorro || LINEAR || THM || align=right | 5.7 km || 
|-id=077 bgcolor=#d6d6d6
| 65077 ||  || — || January 9, 2002 || Socorro || LINEAR || — || align=right | 7.5 km || 
|-id=078 bgcolor=#d6d6d6
| 65078 ||  || — || January 18, 2002 || Anderson Mesa || LONEOS || — || align=right | 7.2 km || 
|-id=079 bgcolor=#E9E9E9
| 65079 ||  || — || January 18, 2002 || Socorro || LINEAR || — || align=right | 5.2 km || 
|-id=080 bgcolor=#d6d6d6
| 65080 ||  || — || January 18, 2002 || Socorro || LINEAR || KOR || align=right | 3.4 km || 
|-id=081 bgcolor=#d6d6d6
| 65081 ||  || — || January 19, 2002 || Socorro || LINEAR || — || align=right | 8.8 km || 
|-id=082 bgcolor=#d6d6d6
| 65082 ||  || — || January 18, 2002 || Socorro || LINEAR || — || align=right | 5.5 km || 
|-id=083 bgcolor=#fefefe
| 65083 ||  || — || January 19, 2002 || Socorro || LINEAR || — || align=right | 2.5 km || 
|-id=084 bgcolor=#E9E9E9
| 65084 ||  || — || January 19, 2002 || Socorro || LINEAR || — || align=right | 4.5 km || 
|-id=085 bgcolor=#d6d6d6
| 65085 ||  || — || January 22, 2002 || Socorro || LINEAR || THM || align=right | 5.2 km || 
|-id=086 bgcolor=#E9E9E9
| 65086 ||  || — || January 25, 2002 || Socorro || LINEAR || HNS || align=right | 3.7 km || 
|-id=087 bgcolor=#d6d6d6
| 65087 ||  || — || January 22, 2002 || Socorro || LINEAR || — || align=right | 3.8 km || 
|-id=088 bgcolor=#d6d6d6
| 65088 ||  || — || January 23, 2002 || Socorro || LINEAR || EOS || align=right | 4.3 km || 
|-id=089 bgcolor=#fefefe
| 65089 ||  || — || January 26, 2002 || Socorro || LINEAR || — || align=right | 2.6 km || 
|-id=090 bgcolor=#E9E9E9
| 65090 ||  || — || January 23, 2002 || Socorro || LINEAR || MAR || align=right | 2.3 km || 
|-id=091 bgcolor=#fefefe
| 65091 Saramagrin || 2002 CF ||  || February 1, 2002 || Cima Ekar || ADAS || V || align=right | 1.8 km || 
|-id=092 bgcolor=#E9E9E9
| 65092 ||  || — || February 3, 2002 || Anderson Mesa || LONEOS || — || align=right | 3.5 km || 
|-id=093 bgcolor=#fefefe
| 65093 ||  || — || February 3, 2002 || Palomar || NEAT || V || align=right | 2.6 km || 
|-id=094 bgcolor=#E9E9E9
| 65094 ||  || — || February 3, 2002 || Palomar || NEAT || — || align=right | 3.0 km || 
|-id=095 bgcolor=#d6d6d6
| 65095 ||  || — || February 3, 2002 || Palomar || NEAT || ALA || align=right | 9.6 km || 
|-id=096 bgcolor=#fefefe
| 65096 ||  || — || February 3, 2002 || Palomar || NEAT || ERI || align=right | 3.8 km || 
|-id=097 bgcolor=#C2FFFF
| 65097 ||  || — || February 6, 2002 || Socorro || LINEAR || L4 || align=right | 22 km || 
|-id=098 bgcolor=#fefefe
| 65098 ||  || — || February 4, 2002 || Palomar || NEAT || — || align=right | 3.0 km || 
|-id=099 bgcolor=#fefefe
| 65099 ||  || — || February 8, 2002 || Fountain Hills || C. W. Juels, P. R. Holvorcem || FLO || align=right | 2.2 km || 
|-id=100 bgcolor=#d6d6d6
| 65100 Birtwhistle ||  ||  || February 8, 2002 || Fountain Hills || C. W. Juels, P. R. Holvorcem || ALA || align=right | 9.5 km || 
|}

65101–65200 

|-bgcolor=#d6d6d6
| 65101 ||  || — || February 8, 2002 || Fountain Hills || C. W. Juels, P. R. Holvorcem || ALA || align=right | 10 km || 
|-id=102 bgcolor=#fefefe
| 65102 ||  || — || February 6, 2002 || Socorro || LINEAR || ERI || align=right | 7.9 km || 
|-id=103 bgcolor=#d6d6d6
| 65103 ||  || — || February 6, 2002 || Socorro || LINEAR || — || align=right | 3.5 km || 
|-id=104 bgcolor=#fefefe
| 65104 ||  || — || February 4, 2002 || Palomar || NEAT || NYS || align=right | 1.6 km || 
|-id=105 bgcolor=#fefefe
| 65105 ||  || — || February 6, 2002 || Socorro || LINEAR || — || align=right | 2.1 km || 
|-id=106 bgcolor=#d6d6d6
| 65106 ||  || — || February 6, 2002 || Socorro || LINEAR || — || align=right | 8.0 km || 
|-id=107 bgcolor=#E9E9E9
| 65107 ||  || — || February 6, 2002 || Socorro || LINEAR || — || align=right | 5.1 km || 
|-id=108 bgcolor=#d6d6d6
| 65108 ||  || — || February 6, 2002 || Socorro || LINEAR || — || align=right | 4.6 km || 
|-id=109 bgcolor=#C2FFFF
| 65109 ||  || — || February 7, 2002 || Socorro || LINEAR || L4 || align=right | 22 km || 
|-id=110 bgcolor=#d6d6d6
| 65110 ||  || — || February 7, 2002 || Socorro || LINEAR || HYG || align=right | 6.6 km || 
|-id=111 bgcolor=#C2FFFF
| 65111 ||  || — || February 6, 2002 || Haleakala || NEAT || L4 || align=right | 21 km || 
|-id=112 bgcolor=#d6d6d6
| 65112 ||  || — || February 6, 2002 || Kitt Peak || Spacewatch || — || align=right | 3.0 km || 
|-id=113 bgcolor=#E9E9E9
| 65113 ||  || — || February 3, 2002 || Haleakala || NEAT || — || align=right | 4.2 km || 
|-id=114 bgcolor=#E9E9E9
| 65114 ||  || — || February 3, 2002 || Haleakala || NEAT || — || align=right | 3.5 km || 
|-id=115 bgcolor=#E9E9E9
| 65115 ||  || — || February 12, 2002 || Desert Eagle || W. K. Y. Yeung || — || align=right | 2.4 km || 
|-id=116 bgcolor=#d6d6d6
| 65116 ||  || — || February 12, 2002 || Desert Eagle || W. K. Y. Yeung || — || align=right | 7.3 km || 
|-id=117 bgcolor=#fefefe
| 65117 ||  || — || February 12, 2002 || Desert Eagle || W. K. Y. Yeung || — || align=right | 1.7 km || 
|-id=118 bgcolor=#d6d6d6
| 65118 ||  || — || February 12, 2002 || Desert Eagle || W. K. Y. Yeung || — || align=right | 7.9 km || 
|-id=119 bgcolor=#d6d6d6
| 65119 ||  || — || February 7, 2002 || Socorro || LINEAR || ALA || align=right | 6.7 km || 
|-id=120 bgcolor=#d6d6d6
| 65120 ||  || — || February 7, 2002 || Socorro || LINEAR || — || align=right | 7.5 km || 
|-id=121 bgcolor=#d6d6d6
| 65121 ||  || — || February 7, 2002 || Socorro || LINEAR || — || align=right | 9.7 km || 
|-id=122 bgcolor=#d6d6d6
| 65122 ||  || — || February 13, 2002 || Socorro || LINEAR || — || align=right | 10 km || 
|-id=123 bgcolor=#d6d6d6
| 65123 ||  || — || February 6, 2002 || Socorro || LINEAR || EOS || align=right | 4.0 km || 
|-id=124 bgcolor=#d6d6d6
| 65124 ||  || — || February 6, 2002 || Socorro || LINEAR || EOS || align=right | 3.7 km || 
|-id=125 bgcolor=#d6d6d6
| 65125 ||  || — || February 6, 2002 || Socorro || LINEAR || — || align=right | 7.6 km || 
|-id=126 bgcolor=#d6d6d6
| 65126 ||  || — || February 6, 2002 || Socorro || LINEAR || EOS || align=right | 4.4 km || 
|-id=127 bgcolor=#E9E9E9
| 65127 ||  || — || February 6, 2002 || Socorro || LINEAR || — || align=right | 8.8 km || 
|-id=128 bgcolor=#d6d6d6
| 65128 ||  || — || February 6, 2002 || Socorro || LINEAR || — || align=right | 6.6 km || 
|-id=129 bgcolor=#d6d6d6
| 65129 ||  || — || February 7, 2002 || Socorro || LINEAR || HYG || align=right | 6.3 km || 
|-id=130 bgcolor=#E9E9E9
| 65130 ||  || — || February 7, 2002 || Socorro || LINEAR || — || align=right | 5.7 km || 
|-id=131 bgcolor=#d6d6d6
| 65131 ||  || — || February 7, 2002 || Socorro || LINEAR || — || align=right | 5.1 km || 
|-id=132 bgcolor=#fefefe
| 65132 ||  || — || February 7, 2002 || Socorro || LINEAR || — || align=right | 4.3 km || 
|-id=133 bgcolor=#d6d6d6
| 65133 ||  || — || February 7, 2002 || Socorro || LINEAR || KOR || align=right | 2.9 km || 
|-id=134 bgcolor=#C2FFFF
| 65134 ||  || — || February 7, 2002 || Socorro || LINEAR || L4 || align=right | 15 km || 
|-id=135 bgcolor=#E9E9E9
| 65135 ||  || — || February 7, 2002 || Socorro || LINEAR || NEM || align=right | 5.2 km || 
|-id=136 bgcolor=#d6d6d6
| 65136 ||  || — || February 7, 2002 || Socorro || LINEAR || KOR || align=right | 3.1 km || 
|-id=137 bgcolor=#E9E9E9
| 65137 ||  || — || February 7, 2002 || Socorro || LINEAR || — || align=right | 1.8 km || 
|-id=138 bgcolor=#d6d6d6
| 65138 ||  || — || February 7, 2002 || Socorro || LINEAR || — || align=right | 5.5 km || 
|-id=139 bgcolor=#fefefe
| 65139 ||  || — || February 7, 2002 || Socorro || LINEAR || V || align=right | 1.5 km || 
|-id=140 bgcolor=#d6d6d6
| 65140 ||  || — || February 7, 2002 || Socorro || LINEAR || — || align=right | 3.8 km || 
|-id=141 bgcolor=#d6d6d6
| 65141 ||  || — || February 7, 2002 || Socorro || LINEAR || — || align=right | 12 km || 
|-id=142 bgcolor=#E9E9E9
| 65142 ||  || — || February 7, 2002 || Socorro || LINEAR || — || align=right | 3.8 km || 
|-id=143 bgcolor=#d6d6d6
| 65143 ||  || — || February 8, 2002 || Socorro || LINEAR || THM || align=right | 5.2 km || 
|-id=144 bgcolor=#fefefe
| 65144 ||  || — || February 8, 2002 || Socorro || LINEAR || V || align=right | 2.3 km || 
|-id=145 bgcolor=#d6d6d6
| 65145 ||  || — || February 8, 2002 || Socorro || LINEAR || 7:4 || align=right | 9.9 km || 
|-id=146 bgcolor=#d6d6d6
| 65146 ||  || — || February 8, 2002 || Socorro || LINEAR || VER || align=right | 8.2 km || 
|-id=147 bgcolor=#d6d6d6
| 65147 ||  || — || February 15, 2002 || Uccle || E. W. Elst, H. Debehogne || EOS || align=right | 4.3 km || 
|-id=148 bgcolor=#fefefe
| 65148 ||  || — || February 11, 2002 || Fountain Hills || C. W. Juels, P. R. Holvorcem || — || align=right | 2.9 km || 
|-id=149 bgcolor=#d6d6d6
| 65149 ||  || — || February 7, 2002 || Socorro || LINEAR || — || align=right | 4.2 km || 
|-id=150 bgcolor=#C2FFFF
| 65150 ||  || — || February 7, 2002 || Socorro || LINEAR || L4ERY || align=right | 17 km || 
|-id=151 bgcolor=#d6d6d6
| 65151 ||  || — || February 7, 2002 || Socorro || LINEAR || THM || align=right | 4.4 km || 
|-id=152 bgcolor=#fefefe
| 65152 ||  || — || February 8, 2002 || Socorro || LINEAR || — || align=right | 2.8 km || 
|-id=153 bgcolor=#d6d6d6
| 65153 ||  || — || February 8, 2002 || Socorro || LINEAR || — || align=right | 7.1 km || 
|-id=154 bgcolor=#d6d6d6
| 65154 ||  || — || February 8, 2002 || Socorro || LINEAR || — || align=right | 4.2 km || 
|-id=155 bgcolor=#d6d6d6
| 65155 ||  || — || February 8, 2002 || Socorro || LINEAR || — || align=right | 5.7 km || 
|-id=156 bgcolor=#d6d6d6
| 65156 ||  || — || February 9, 2002 || Socorro || LINEAR || HYG || align=right | 5.3 km || 
|-id=157 bgcolor=#d6d6d6
| 65157 ||  || — || February 9, 2002 || Socorro || LINEAR || EOS || align=right | 4.1 km || 
|-id=158 bgcolor=#d6d6d6
| 65158 ||  || — || February 10, 2002 || Socorro || LINEAR || KOR || align=right | 2.5 km || 
|-id=159 bgcolor=#d6d6d6
| 65159 Sprowls ||  ||  || February 14, 2002 || Cordell-Lorenz || D. T. Durig || — || align=right | 7.3 km || 
|-id=160 bgcolor=#E9E9E9
| 65160 ||  || — || February 7, 2002 || Socorro || LINEAR || — || align=right | 4.8 km || 
|-id=161 bgcolor=#d6d6d6
| 65161 ||  || — || February 8, 2002 || Socorro || LINEAR || MEL || align=right | 8.5 km || 
|-id=162 bgcolor=#E9E9E9
| 65162 ||  || — || February 8, 2002 || Socorro || LINEAR || — || align=right | 6.3 km || 
|-id=163 bgcolor=#E9E9E9
| 65163 ||  || — || February 8, 2002 || Socorro || LINEAR || EUN || align=right | 3.1 km || 
|-id=164 bgcolor=#E9E9E9
| 65164 ||  || — || February 8, 2002 || Socorro || LINEAR || — || align=right | 5.5 km || 
|-id=165 bgcolor=#d6d6d6
| 65165 ||  || — || February 8, 2002 || Socorro || LINEAR || EOS || align=right | 4.6 km || 
|-id=166 bgcolor=#d6d6d6
| 65166 ||  || — || February 8, 2002 || Socorro || LINEAR || — || align=right | 7.7 km || 
|-id=167 bgcolor=#E9E9E9
| 65167 ||  || — || February 8, 2002 || Socorro || LINEAR || WIT || align=right | 2.1 km || 
|-id=168 bgcolor=#fefefe
| 65168 ||  || — || February 8, 2002 || Socorro || LINEAR || — || align=right | 1.6 km || 
|-id=169 bgcolor=#d6d6d6
| 65169 ||  || — || February 8, 2002 || Socorro || LINEAR || — || align=right | 7.6 km || 
|-id=170 bgcolor=#d6d6d6
| 65170 ||  || — || February 8, 2002 || Socorro || LINEAR || — || align=right | 8.9 km || 
|-id=171 bgcolor=#d6d6d6
| 65171 ||  || — || February 8, 2002 || Socorro || LINEAR || — || align=right | 6.7 km || 
|-id=172 bgcolor=#fefefe
| 65172 ||  || — || February 8, 2002 || Socorro || LINEAR || — || align=right | 2.0 km || 
|-id=173 bgcolor=#E9E9E9
| 65173 ||  || — || February 10, 2002 || Socorro || LINEAR || — || align=right | 4.8 km || 
|-id=174 bgcolor=#C2FFFF
| 65174 ||  || — || February 10, 2002 || Socorro || LINEAR || L4 || align=right | 13 km || 
|-id=175 bgcolor=#E9E9E9
| 65175 ||  || — || February 10, 2002 || Socorro || LINEAR || — || align=right | 4.0 km || 
|-id=176 bgcolor=#fefefe
| 65176 ||  || — || February 10, 2002 || Socorro || LINEAR || — || align=right | 1.3 km || 
|-id=177 bgcolor=#d6d6d6
| 65177 ||  || — || February 10, 2002 || Socorro || LINEAR || KOR || align=right | 4.2 km || 
|-id=178 bgcolor=#d6d6d6
| 65178 ||  || — || February 10, 2002 || Socorro || LINEAR || — || align=right | 7.4 km || 
|-id=179 bgcolor=#C2FFFF
| 65179 ||  || — || February 11, 2002 || Socorro || LINEAR || L4 || align=right | 14 km || 
|-id=180 bgcolor=#fefefe
| 65180 ||  || — || February 11, 2002 || Socorro || LINEAR || — || align=right | 1.7 km || 
|-id=181 bgcolor=#d6d6d6
| 65181 ||  || — || February 3, 2002 || Haleakala || NEAT || EOS || align=right | 3.7 km || 
|-id=182 bgcolor=#fefefe
| 65182 ||  || — || February 10, 2002 || Socorro || LINEAR || NYS || align=right | 1.6 km || 
|-id=183 bgcolor=#d6d6d6
| 65183 ||  || — || February 8, 2002 || Socorro || LINEAR || EOS || align=right | 4.2 km || 
|-id=184 bgcolor=#d6d6d6
| 65184 ||  || — || February 11, 2002 || Socorro || LINEAR || — || align=right | 6.2 km || 
|-id=185 bgcolor=#fefefe
| 65185 ||  || — || February 11, 2002 || Socorro || LINEAR || V || align=right | 1.5 km || 
|-id=186 bgcolor=#fefefe
| 65186 ||  || — || February 11, 2002 || Socorro || LINEAR || — || align=right | 4.1 km || 
|-id=187 bgcolor=#d6d6d6
| 65187 ||  || — || February 13, 2002 || Kitt Peak || Spacewatch || KOR || align=right | 3.4 km || 
|-id=188 bgcolor=#E9E9E9
| 65188 ||  || — || February 15, 2002 || Socorro || LINEAR || — || align=right | 2.7 km || 
|-id=189 bgcolor=#E9E9E9
| 65189 ||  || — || February 15, 2002 || Socorro || LINEAR || — || align=right | 4.2 km || 
|-id=190 bgcolor=#d6d6d6
| 65190 ||  || — || February 15, 2002 || Socorro || LINEAR || — || align=right | 9.2 km || 
|-id=191 bgcolor=#d6d6d6
| 65191 ||  || — || February 6, 2002 || Kitt Peak || M. W. Buie || THM || align=right | 6.8 km || 
|-id=192 bgcolor=#d6d6d6
| 65192 ||  || — || February 7, 2002 || Haleakala || NEAT || CHA || align=right | 5.2 km || 
|-id=193 bgcolor=#d6d6d6
| 65193 ||  || — || February 6, 2002 || Socorro || LINEAR || — || align=right | 8.3 km || 
|-id=194 bgcolor=#C2FFFF
| 65194 ||  || — || February 8, 2002 || Socorro || LINEAR || L4 || align=right | 19 km || 
|-id=195 bgcolor=#d6d6d6
| 65195 ||  || — || February 7, 2002 || Socorro || LINEAR || HYG || align=right | 4.1 km || 
|-id=196 bgcolor=#d6d6d6
| 65196 ||  || — || February 7, 2002 || Palomar || NEAT || EOS || align=right | 3.3 km || 
|-id=197 bgcolor=#fefefe
| 65197 ||  || — || February 8, 2002 || Socorro || LINEAR || — || align=right | 1.5 km || 
|-id=198 bgcolor=#d6d6d6
| 65198 ||  || — || February 8, 2002 || Kitt Peak || Spacewatch || THM || align=right | 4.7 km || 
|-id=199 bgcolor=#d6d6d6
| 65199 ||  || — || February 9, 2002 || Kitt Peak || Spacewatch || — || align=right | 4.0 km || 
|-id=200 bgcolor=#d6d6d6
| 65200 ||  || — || February 10, 2002 || Socorro || LINEAR || EOS || align=right | 4.9 km || 
|}

65201–65300 

|-bgcolor=#d6d6d6
| 65201 ||  || — || February 10, 2002 || Socorro || LINEAR || EOS || align=right | 4.4 km || 
|-id=202 bgcolor=#fefefe
| 65202 ||  || — || February 15, 2002 || Socorro || LINEAR || — || align=right | 2.4 km || 
|-id=203 bgcolor=#d6d6d6
| 65203 || 2002 DU || — || February 17, 2002 || Needville || Needville Obs. || — || align=right | 4.5 km || 
|-id=204 bgcolor=#E9E9E9
| 65204 ||  || — || February 22, 2002 || Palomar || NEAT || — || align=right | 4.6 km || 
|-id=205 bgcolor=#C2FFFF
| 65205 ||  || — || February 24, 2002 || Palomar || NEAT || L4 || align=right | 18 km || 
|-id=206 bgcolor=#C2FFFF
| 65206 ||  || — || February 24, 2002 || Palomar || NEAT || L4 || align=right | 12 km || 
|-id=207 bgcolor=#E9E9E9
| 65207 ||  || — || February 16, 2002 || Palomar || NEAT || — || align=right | 5.4 km || 
|-id=208 bgcolor=#d6d6d6
| 65208 ||  || — || February 19, 2002 || Kitt Peak || Spacewatch || — || align=right | 7.8 km || 
|-id=209 bgcolor=#C2FFFF
| 65209 ||  || — || February 20, 2002 || Anderson Mesa || LONEOS || L4 || align=right | 20 km || 
|-id=210 bgcolor=#C2FFFF
| 65210 Stichius || 2002 EG ||  || March 2, 2002 || Uccle || E. W. Elst, H. Debehogne || L4 || align=right | 22 km || 
|-id=211 bgcolor=#C2FFFF
| 65211 ||  || — || March 6, 2002 || Ondřejov || P. Kušnirák || L4 || align=right | 13 km || 
|-id=212 bgcolor=#fefefe
| 65212 ||  || — || March 5, 2002 || Socorro || LINEAR || H || align=right | 1.7 km || 
|-id=213 bgcolor=#d6d6d6
| 65213 Peterhobbs ||  ||  || March 12, 2002 || Nogales || Tenagra II Obs. || — || align=right | 8.5 km || 
|-id=214 bgcolor=#fefefe
| 65214 ||  || — || March 14, 2002 || Desert Eagle || W. K. Y. Yeung || NYS || align=right | 1.1 km || 
|-id=215 bgcolor=#fefefe
| 65215 ||  || — || March 3, 2002 || Haleakala || NEAT || — || align=right | 3.5 km || 
|-id=216 bgcolor=#C2FFFF
| 65216 ||  || — || March 5, 2002 || Palomar || NEAT || L4 || align=right | 18 km || 
|-id=217 bgcolor=#C2FFFF
| 65217 ||  || — || March 9, 2002 || Socorro || LINEAR || L4 || align=right | 16 km || 
|-id=218 bgcolor=#fefefe
| 65218 ||  || — || March 9, 2002 || Socorro || LINEAR || — || align=right | 1.9 km || 
|-id=219 bgcolor=#d6d6d6
| 65219 ||  || — || March 10, 2002 || Haleakala || NEAT || — || align=right | 5.0 km || 
|-id=220 bgcolor=#E9E9E9
| 65220 ||  || — || March 10, 2002 || Haleakala || NEAT || — || align=right | 6.7 km || 
|-id=221 bgcolor=#E9E9E9
| 65221 ||  || — || March 10, 2002 || Haleakala || NEAT || — || align=right | 3.6 km || 
|-id=222 bgcolor=#fefefe
| 65222 ||  || — || March 9, 2002 || Socorro || LINEAR || NYS || align=right | 1.2 km || 
|-id=223 bgcolor=#C2FFFF
| 65223 ||  || — || March 11, 2002 || Palomar || NEAT || L4slow || align=right | 18 km || 
|-id=224 bgcolor=#C2FFFF
| 65224 ||  || — || March 13, 2002 || Socorro || LINEAR || L4 || align=right | 16 km || 
|-id=225 bgcolor=#C2FFFF
| 65225 ||  || — || March 13, 2002 || Socorro || LINEAR || L4ERY || align=right | 17 km || 
|-id=226 bgcolor=#E9E9E9
| 65226 ||  || — || March 11, 2002 || Haleakala || NEAT || — || align=right | 4.2 km || 
|-id=227 bgcolor=#C2FFFF
| 65227 ||  || — || March 11, 2002 || Haleakala || NEAT || L4 || align=right | 14 km || 
|-id=228 bgcolor=#C2FFFF
| 65228 ||  || — || March 13, 2002 || Socorro || LINEAR || L4 || align=right | 19 km || 
|-id=229 bgcolor=#C2FFFF
| 65229 ||  || — || March 13, 2002 || Socorro || LINEAR || L4 || align=right | 16 km || 
|-id=230 bgcolor=#E9E9E9
| 65230 ||  || — || March 13, 2002 || Socorro || LINEAR || HOF || align=right | 5.6 km || 
|-id=231 bgcolor=#fefefe
| 65231 ||  || — || March 13, 2002 || Socorro || LINEAR || NYS || align=right | 3.8 km || 
|-id=232 bgcolor=#C2FFFF
| 65232 ||  || — || March 9, 2002 || Socorro || LINEAR || L4 || align=right | 13 km || 
|-id=233 bgcolor=#E9E9E9
| 65233 ||  || — || March 9, 2002 || Socorro || LINEAR || — || align=right | 4.1 km || 
|-id=234 bgcolor=#E9E9E9
| 65234 ||  || — || March 14, 2002 || Socorro || LINEAR || — || align=right | 3.8 km || 
|-id=235 bgcolor=#fefefe
| 65235 ||  || — || March 11, 2002 || Socorro || LINEAR || — || align=right | 2.1 km || 
|-id=236 bgcolor=#d6d6d6
| 65236 ||  || — || March 12, 2002 || Socorro || LINEAR || 3:2 || align=right | 12 km || 
|-id=237 bgcolor=#d6d6d6
| 65237 ||  || — || March 12, 2002 || Socorro || LINEAR || — || align=right | 6.9 km || 
|-id=238 bgcolor=#E9E9E9
| 65238 ||  || — || March 12, 2002 || Socorro || LINEAR || — || align=right | 3.8 km || 
|-id=239 bgcolor=#d6d6d6
| 65239 ||  || — || March 6, 2002 || Socorro || LINEAR || — || align=right | 5.3 km || 
|-id=240 bgcolor=#C2FFFF
| 65240 ||  || — || March 9, 2002 || Anderson Mesa || LONEOS || L4slow? || align=right | 16 km || 
|-id=241 bgcolor=#E9E9E9
| 65241 Seeley ||  ||  || March 9, 2002 || Catalina || CSS || — || align=right | 5.5 km || 
|-id=242 bgcolor=#fefefe
| 65242 ||  || — || March 10, 2002 || Haleakala || NEAT || V || align=right | 1.9 km || 
|-id=243 bgcolor=#C2FFFF
| 65243 ||  || — || March 10, 2002 || Kitt Peak || Spacewatch || L4 || align=right | 13 km || 
|-id=244 bgcolor=#d6d6d6
| 65244 Ianwong ||  ||  || March 12, 2002 || Anderson Mesa || LONEOS || HIL3:2 || align=right | 13 km || 
|-id=245 bgcolor=#C2FFFF
| 65245 ||  || — || March 12, 2002 || Anderson Mesa || LONEOS || L4 || align=right | 20 km || 
|-id=246 bgcolor=#d6d6d6
| 65246 ||  || — || March 14, 2002 || Palomar || NEAT || LIX || align=right | 9.3 km || 
|-id=247 bgcolor=#E9E9E9
| 65247 || 2002 FR || — || March 18, 2002 || Desert Eagle || W. K. Y. Yeung || — || align=right | 4.9 km || 
|-id=248 bgcolor=#d6d6d6
| 65248 ||  || — || March 20, 2002 || Desert Eagle || W. K. Y. Yeung || — || align=right | 6.1 km || 
|-id=249 bgcolor=#E9E9E9
| 65249 ||  || — || March 20, 2002 || Socorro || LINEAR || — || align=right | 7.5 km || 
|-id=250 bgcolor=#C2FFFF
| 65250 ||  || — || March 16, 2002 || Socorro || LINEAR || L4 || align=right | 12 km || 
|-id=251 bgcolor=#fefefe
| 65251 ||  || — || March 16, 2002 || Socorro || LINEAR || MAS || align=right | 1.4 km || 
|-id=252 bgcolor=#d6d6d6
| 65252 ||  || — || March 19, 2002 || Palomar || NEAT || — || align=right | 11 km || 
|-id=253 bgcolor=#d6d6d6
| 65253 ||  || — || March 20, 2002 || Palomar || NEAT || — || align=right | 8.1 km || 
|-id=254 bgcolor=#d6d6d6
| 65254 ||  || — || March 20, 2002 || Socorro || LINEAR || — || align=right | 5.6 km || 
|-id=255 bgcolor=#d6d6d6
| 65255 ||  || — || March 20, 2002 || Palomar || NEAT || — || align=right | 3.2 km || 
|-id=256 bgcolor=#d6d6d6
| 65256 ||  || — || March 20, 2002 || Anderson Mesa || LONEOS || — || align=right | 6.7 km || 
|-id=257 bgcolor=#C2FFFF
| 65257 ||  || — || March 23, 2002 || Socorro || LINEAR || L4 || align=right | 23 km || 
|-id=258 bgcolor=#d6d6d6
| 65258 ||  || — || March 30, 2002 || Palomar || NEAT || — || align=right | 7.6 km || 
|-id=259 bgcolor=#d6d6d6
| 65259 || 2002 GP || — || April 3, 2002 || Kvistaberg || UDAS || — || align=right | 6.4 km || 
|-id=260 bgcolor=#fefefe
| 65260 ||  || — || April 6, 2002 || Emerald Lane || L. Ball || FLO || align=right | 1.4 km || 
|-id=261 bgcolor=#fefefe
| 65261 ||  || — || April 15, 2002 || Socorro || LINEAR || — || align=right | 2.7 km || 
|-id=262 bgcolor=#d6d6d6
| 65262 ||  || — || April 14, 2002 || Socorro || LINEAR || — || align=right | 5.5 km || 
|-id=263 bgcolor=#fefefe
| 65263 ||  || — || April 15, 2002 || Socorro || LINEAR || FLO || align=right | 1.9 km || 
|-id=264 bgcolor=#d6d6d6
| 65264 ||  || — || April 15, 2002 || Socorro || LINEAR || LIX || align=right | 9.5 km || 
|-id=265 bgcolor=#d6d6d6
| 65265 ||  || — || April 15, 2002 || Socorro || LINEAR || — || align=right | 4.9 km || 
|-id=266 bgcolor=#d6d6d6
| 65266 ||  || — || April 14, 2002 || Socorro || LINEAR || AEG || align=right | 5.6 km || 
|-id=267 bgcolor=#E9E9E9
| 65267 ||  || — || April 14, 2002 || Haleakala || NEAT || — || align=right | 2.6 km || 
|-id=268 bgcolor=#fefefe
| 65268 ||  || — || April 15, 2002 || Palomar || NEAT || NYS || align=right | 1.4 km || 
|-id=269 bgcolor=#d6d6d6
| 65269 ||  || — || April 2, 2002 || Palomar || NEAT || HYG || align=right | 6.8 km || 
|-id=270 bgcolor=#fefefe
| 65270 ||  || — || April 3, 2002 || Palomar || NEAT || FLO || align=right | 2.5 km || 
|-id=271 bgcolor=#E9E9E9
| 65271 ||  || — || April 4, 2002 || Palomar || NEAT || — || align=right | 4.1 km || 
|-id=272 bgcolor=#d6d6d6
| 65272 ||  || — || April 4, 2002 || Haleakala || NEAT || URS || align=right | 7.5 km || 
|-id=273 bgcolor=#d6d6d6
| 65273 ||  || — || April 4, 2002 || Palomar || NEAT || 7:4 || align=right | 8.1 km || 
|-id=274 bgcolor=#fefefe
| 65274 ||  || — || April 5, 2002 || Anderson Mesa || LONEOS || — || align=right | 2.1 km || 
|-id=275 bgcolor=#fefefe
| 65275 ||  || — || April 5, 2002 || Anderson Mesa || LONEOS || FLO || align=right | 1.8 km || 
|-id=276 bgcolor=#fefefe
| 65276 ||  || — || April 9, 2002 || Socorro || LINEAR || FLO || align=right | 1.6 km || 
|-id=277 bgcolor=#fefefe
| 65277 ||  || — || April 10, 2002 || Socorro || LINEAR || — || align=right | 1.3 km || 
|-id=278 bgcolor=#d6d6d6
| 65278 ||  || — || April 10, 2002 || Socorro || LINEAR || — || align=right | 7.6 km || 
|-id=279 bgcolor=#d6d6d6
| 65279 ||  || — || April 11, 2002 || Socorro || LINEAR || TEL || align=right | 3.8 km || 
|-id=280 bgcolor=#d6d6d6
| 65280 ||  || — || April 11, 2002 || Socorro || LINEAR || LIX || align=right | 6.3 km || 
|-id=281 bgcolor=#C2FFFF
| 65281 ||  || — || April 10, 2002 || Palomar || NEAT || L4 || align=right | 20 km || 
|-id=282 bgcolor=#E9E9E9
| 65282 ||  || — || April 14, 2002 || Palomar || NEAT || — || align=right | 1.5 km || 
|-id=283 bgcolor=#E9E9E9
| 65283 ||  || — || April 10, 2002 || Socorro || LINEAR || — || align=right | 2.2 km || 
|-id=284 bgcolor=#E9E9E9
| 65284 ||  || — || April 16, 2002 || Socorro || LINEAR || — || align=right | 4.6 km || 
|-id=285 bgcolor=#E9E9E9
| 65285 ||  || — || April 16, 2002 || Socorro || LINEAR || AGN || align=right | 2.6 km || 
|-id=286 bgcolor=#fefefe
| 65286 ||  || — || April 21, 2002 || Reedy Creek || J. Broughton || — || align=right | 1.8 km || 
|-id=287 bgcolor=#E9E9E9
| 65287 ||  || — || April 22, 2002 || Palomar || NEAT || MAR || align=right | 3.0 km || 
|-id=288 bgcolor=#fefefe
| 65288 ||  || — || April 21, 2002 || Socorro || LINEAR || H || align=right | 1.2 km || 
|-id=289 bgcolor=#E9E9E9
| 65289 || 2002 JX || — || May 3, 2002 || Desert Eagle || W. K. Y. Yeung || — || align=right | 4.8 km || 
|-id=290 bgcolor=#E9E9E9
| 65290 ||  || — || May 5, 2002 || Socorro || LINEAR || HNS || align=right | 3.0 km || 
|-id=291 bgcolor=#fefefe
| 65291 ||  || — || May 6, 2002 || Anderson Mesa || LONEOS || FLO || align=right | 1.6 km || 
|-id=292 bgcolor=#E9E9E9
| 65292 ||  || — || May 8, 2002 || Socorro || LINEAR || — || align=right | 2.3 km || 
|-id=293 bgcolor=#fefefe
| 65293 ||  || — || May 7, 2002 || Palomar || NEAT || NYS || align=right | 2.7 km || 
|-id=294 bgcolor=#E9E9E9
| 65294 ||  || — || May 8, 2002 || Socorro || LINEAR || GEF || align=right | 3.4 km || 
|-id=295 bgcolor=#E9E9E9
| 65295 ||  || — || May 8, 2002 || Socorro || LINEAR || HEN || align=right | 2.4 km || 
|-id=296 bgcolor=#d6d6d6
| 65296 ||  || — || May 8, 2002 || Socorro || LINEAR || EOS || align=right | 3.9 km || 
|-id=297 bgcolor=#d6d6d6
| 65297 ||  || — || May 9, 2002 || Socorro || LINEAR || 7:4 || align=right | 6.4 km || 
|-id=298 bgcolor=#d6d6d6
| 65298 ||  || — || May 9, 2002 || Palomar || NEAT || — || align=right | 5.4 km || 
|-id=299 bgcolor=#E9E9E9
| 65299 ||  || — || May 8, 2002 || Socorro || LINEAR || — || align=right | 1.8 km || 
|-id=300 bgcolor=#d6d6d6
| 65300 ||  || — || May 9, 2002 || Socorro || LINEAR || — || align=right | 9.3 km || 
|}

65301–65400 

|-bgcolor=#fefefe
| 65301 ||  || — || May 9, 2002 || Socorro || LINEAR || NYS || align=right | 1.5 km || 
|-id=302 bgcolor=#d6d6d6
| 65302 ||  || — || May 9, 2002 || Socorro || LINEAR || — || align=right | 7.8 km || 
|-id=303 bgcolor=#fefefe
| 65303 ||  || — || May 9, 2002 || Socorro || LINEAR || — || align=right | 1.4 km || 
|-id=304 bgcolor=#fefefe
| 65304 ||  || — || May 9, 2002 || Socorro || LINEAR || — || align=right | 2.0 km || 
|-id=305 bgcolor=#fefefe
| 65305 ||  || — || May 9, 2002 || Socorro || LINEAR || NYS || align=right | 1.3 km || 
|-id=306 bgcolor=#fefefe
| 65306 ||  || — || May 9, 2002 || Socorro || LINEAR || NYS || align=right | 3.8 km || 
|-id=307 bgcolor=#d6d6d6
| 65307 ||  || — || May 9, 2002 || Socorro || LINEAR || — || align=right | 6.5 km || 
|-id=308 bgcolor=#fefefe
| 65308 ||  || — || May 9, 2002 || Socorro || LINEAR || FLO || align=right | 1.6 km || 
|-id=309 bgcolor=#fefefe
| 65309 ||  || — || May 10, 2002 || Socorro || LINEAR || — || align=right | 1.7 km || 
|-id=310 bgcolor=#E9E9E9
| 65310 ||  || — || May 7, 2002 || Socorro || LINEAR || GEF || align=right | 2.8 km || 
|-id=311 bgcolor=#d6d6d6
| 65311 ||  || — || May 11, 2002 || Socorro || LINEAR || — || align=right | 8.8 km || 
|-id=312 bgcolor=#E9E9E9
| 65312 ||  || — || May 11, 2002 || Socorro || LINEAR || MRX || align=right | 2.8 km || 
|-id=313 bgcolor=#E9E9E9
| 65313 ||  || — || May 11, 2002 || Socorro || LINEAR || — || align=right | 4.2 km || 
|-id=314 bgcolor=#d6d6d6
| 65314 ||  || — || May 11, 2002 || Socorro || LINEAR || THM || align=right | 3.5 km || 
|-id=315 bgcolor=#d6d6d6
| 65315 ||  || — || May 9, 2002 || Socorro || LINEAR || HYG || align=right | 7.3 km || 
|-id=316 bgcolor=#fefefe
| 65316 ||  || — || May 10, 2002 || Socorro || LINEAR || NYS || align=right | 1.3 km || 
|-id=317 bgcolor=#fefefe
| 65317 ||  || — || May 10, 2002 || Socorro || LINEAR || — || align=right | 1.9 km || 
|-id=318 bgcolor=#fefefe
| 65318 ||  || — || May 11, 2002 || Palomar || NEAT || V || align=right | 1.5 km || 
|-id=319 bgcolor=#d6d6d6
| 65319 ||  || — || May 7, 2002 || Anderson Mesa || LONEOS || — || align=right | 6.6 km || 
|-id=320 bgcolor=#fefefe
| 65320 ||  || — || May 8, 2002 || Anderson Mesa || LONEOS || — || align=right | 2.7 km || 
|-id=321 bgcolor=#d6d6d6
| 65321 ||  || — || May 9, 2002 || Socorro || LINEAR || EOS || align=right | 4.1 km || 
|-id=322 bgcolor=#d6d6d6
| 65322 || 2002 KS || — || May 16, 2002 || Haleakala || NEAT || — || align=right | 7.9 km || 
|-id=323 bgcolor=#E9E9E9
| 65323 ||  || — || May 16, 2002 || Socorro || LINEAR || — || align=right | 4.3 km || 
|-id=324 bgcolor=#fefefe
| 65324 ||  || — || June 5, 2002 || Socorro || LINEAR || FLO || align=right | 1.7 km || 
|-id=325 bgcolor=#E9E9E9
| 65325 ||  || — || June 6, 2002 || Socorro || LINEAR || — || align=right | 4.2 km || 
|-id=326 bgcolor=#d6d6d6
| 65326 ||  || — || June 6, 2002 || Socorro || LINEAR || — || align=right | 5.2 km || 
|-id=327 bgcolor=#fefefe
| 65327 ||  || — || June 6, 2002 || Socorro || LINEAR || — || align=right | 1.7 km || 
|-id=328 bgcolor=#E9E9E9
| 65328 ||  || — || June 8, 2002 || Socorro || LINEAR || — || align=right | 2.5 km || 
|-id=329 bgcolor=#E9E9E9
| 65329 ||  || — || June 8, 2002 || Socorro || LINEAR || — || align=right | 5.4 km || 
|-id=330 bgcolor=#d6d6d6
| 65330 ||  || — || June 5, 2002 || Palomar || NEAT || — || align=right | 7.8 km || 
|-id=331 bgcolor=#d6d6d6
| 65331 ||  || — || June 9, 2002 || Socorro || LINEAR || — || align=right | 7.6 km || 
|-id=332 bgcolor=#E9E9E9
| 65332 ||  || — || June 4, 2002 || Palomar || NEAT || — || align=right | 4.5 km || 
|-id=333 bgcolor=#d6d6d6
| 65333 ||  || — || June 10, 2002 || Palomar || NEAT || — || align=right | 5.9 km || 
|-id=334 bgcolor=#fefefe
| 65334 ||  || — || June 10, 2002 || Palomar || NEAT || — || align=right | 1.8 km || 
|-id=335 bgcolor=#FA8072
| 65335 ||  || — || June 3, 2002 || Socorro || LINEAR || — || align=right | 2.3 km || 
|-id=336 bgcolor=#d6d6d6
| 65336 ||  || — || June 3, 2002 || Socorro || LINEAR || URS || align=right | 6.9 km || 
|-id=337 bgcolor=#E9E9E9
| 65337 ||  || — || June 17, 2002 || Palomar || NEAT || — || align=right | 2.4 km || 
|-id=338 bgcolor=#E9E9E9
| 65338 ||  || — || July 4, 2002 || Palomar || NEAT || — || align=right | 2.4 km || 
|-id=339 bgcolor=#d6d6d6
| 65339 ||  || — || July 4, 2002 || Palomar || NEAT || EOS || align=right | 5.5 km || 
|-id=340 bgcolor=#fefefe
| 65340 ||  || — || July 4, 2002 || Palomar || NEAT || NYS || align=right | 1.5 km || 
|-id=341 bgcolor=#fefefe
| 65341 ||  || — || July 4, 2002 || Palomar || NEAT || NYS || align=right | 1.3 km || 
|-id=342 bgcolor=#d6d6d6
| 65342 ||  || — || July 4, 2002 || Palomar || NEAT || — || align=right | 4.4 km || 
|-id=343 bgcolor=#E9E9E9
| 65343 ||  || — || July 5, 2002 || Socorro || LINEAR || NEM || align=right | 4.7 km || 
|-id=344 bgcolor=#fefefe
| 65344 ||  || — || July 9, 2002 || Socorro || LINEAR || — || align=right | 1.5 km || 
|-id=345 bgcolor=#fefefe
| 65345 ||  || — || July 9, 2002 || Socorro || LINEAR || V || align=right | 1.8 km || 
|-id=346 bgcolor=#E9E9E9
| 65346 ||  || — || July 9, 2002 || Socorro || LINEAR || JUN || align=right | 2.1 km || 
|-id=347 bgcolor=#fefefe
| 65347 ||  || — || July 9, 2002 || Socorro || LINEAR || — || align=right | 1.8 km || 
|-id=348 bgcolor=#fefefe
| 65348 ||  || — || July 9, 2002 || Socorro || LINEAR || — || align=right | 1.6 km || 
|-id=349 bgcolor=#fefefe
| 65349 ||  || — || July 9, 2002 || Socorro || LINEAR || FLO || align=right data-sort-value="0.90" | 900 m || 
|-id=350 bgcolor=#d6d6d6
| 65350 ||  || — || July 14, 2002 || Palomar || NEAT || — || align=right | 7.8 km || 
|-id=351 bgcolor=#fefefe
| 65351 ||  || — || July 9, 2002 || Socorro || LINEAR || — || align=right | 1.6 km || 
|-id=352 bgcolor=#d6d6d6
| 65352 ||  || — || July 14, 2002 || Palomar || NEAT || THM || align=right | 7.1 km || 
|-id=353 bgcolor=#d6d6d6
| 65353 ||  || — || July 14, 2002 || Palomar || NEAT || THM || align=right | 3.9 km || 
|-id=354 bgcolor=#fefefe
| 65354 ||  || — || July 15, 2002 || Palomar || NEAT || ERI || align=right | 3.6 km || 
|-id=355 bgcolor=#fefefe
| 65355 ||  || — || July 14, 2002 || Palomar || NEAT || NYS || align=right | 1.2 km || 
|-id=356 bgcolor=#fefefe
| 65356 ||  || — || July 5, 2002 || Socorro || LINEAR || — || align=right | 1.5 km || 
|-id=357 bgcolor=#E9E9E9
| 65357 Antoniucci ||  ||  || July 12, 2002 || Campo Imperatore || CINEOS || — || align=right | 2.4 km || 
|-id=358 bgcolor=#E9E9E9
| 65358 || 2002 OS || — || July 17, 2002 || Socorro || LINEAR || — || align=right | 2.5 km || 
|-id=359 bgcolor=#E9E9E9
| 65359 ||  || — || July 22, 2002 || Palomar || NEAT || — || align=right | 3.3 km || 
|-id=360 bgcolor=#E9E9E9
| 65360 ||  || — || July 22, 2002 || Palomar || NEAT || DOR || align=right | 7.4 km || 
|-id=361 bgcolor=#d6d6d6
| 65361 ||  || — || July 18, 2002 || Socorro || LINEAR || — || align=right | 5.5 km || 
|-id=362 bgcolor=#fefefe
| 65362 ||  || — || July 22, 2002 || Palomar || NEAT || — || align=right | 3.3 km || 
|-id=363 bgcolor=#fefefe
| 65363 Ruthanna ||  ||  || August 7, 2002 || Needville || J. Dellinger || NYS || align=right | 1.3 km || 
|-id=364 bgcolor=#d6d6d6
| 65364 ||  || — || August 6, 2002 || Palomar || NEAT || — || align=right | 4.5 km || 
|-id=365 bgcolor=#d6d6d6
| 65365 ||  || — || August 6, 2002 || Palomar || NEAT || KOR || align=right | 2.5 km || 
|-id=366 bgcolor=#fefefe
| 65366 ||  || — || August 6, 2002 || Palomar || NEAT || FLO || align=right | 1.6 km || 
|-id=367 bgcolor=#fefefe
| 65367 ||  || — || August 6, 2002 || Palomar || NEAT || ERI || align=right | 2.8 km || 
|-id=368 bgcolor=#E9E9E9
| 65368 ||  || — || August 4, 2002 || Socorro || LINEAR || — || align=right | 1.5 km || 
|-id=369 bgcolor=#E9E9E9
| 65369 ||  || — || August 5, 2002 || Socorro || LINEAR || — || align=right | 4.3 km || 
|-id=370 bgcolor=#E9E9E9
| 65370 ||  || — || August 5, 2002 || Socorro || LINEAR || — || align=right | 4.7 km || 
|-id=371 bgcolor=#E9E9E9
| 65371 ||  || — || August 9, 2002 || Socorro || LINEAR || — || align=right | 5.1 km || 
|-id=372 bgcolor=#fefefe
| 65372 ||  || — || August 9, 2002 || Socorro || LINEAR || — || align=right | 2.1 km || 
|-id=373 bgcolor=#d6d6d6
| 65373 ||  || — || August 8, 2002 || Palomar || NEAT || THM || align=right | 7.1 km || 
|-id=374 bgcolor=#d6d6d6
| 65374 ||  || — || August 9, 2002 || Socorro || LINEAR || HIL3:2 || align=right | 16 km || 
|-id=375 bgcolor=#E9E9E9
| 65375 ||  || — || August 9, 2002 || Socorro || LINEAR || — || align=right | 4.0 km || 
|-id=376 bgcolor=#d6d6d6
| 65376 ||  || — || August 11, 2002 || Palomar || NEAT || — || align=right | 4.7 km || 
|-id=377 bgcolor=#E9E9E9
| 65377 ||  || — || August 12, 2002 || Reedy Creek || J. Broughton || — || align=right | 2.8 km || 
|-id=378 bgcolor=#d6d6d6
| 65378 ||  || — || August 9, 2002 || Socorro || LINEAR || — || align=right | 7.2 km || 
|-id=379 bgcolor=#fefefe
| 65379 ||  || — || August 10, 2002 || Socorro || LINEAR || — || align=right | 1.4 km || 
|-id=380 bgcolor=#fefefe
| 65380 ||  || — || August 14, 2002 || Socorro || LINEAR || FLO || align=right | 3.8 km || 
|-id=381 bgcolor=#E9E9E9
| 65381 ||  || — || August 13, 2002 || Anderson Mesa || LONEOS || — || align=right | 4.5 km || 
|-id=382 bgcolor=#E9E9E9
| 65382 ||  || — || August 14, 2002 || Socorro || LINEAR || — || align=right | 5.1 km || 
|-id=383 bgcolor=#d6d6d6
| 65383 ||  || — || August 15, 2002 || Palomar || NEAT || KAR || align=right | 2.0 km || 
|-id=384 bgcolor=#fefefe
| 65384 ||  || — || August 14, 2002 || Socorro || LINEAR || EUT || align=right | 1.5 km || 
|-id=385 bgcolor=#E9E9E9
| 65385 || 2002 QW || — || August 16, 2002 || Kitt Peak || Spacewatch || — || align=right | 1.5 km || 
|-id=386 bgcolor=#E9E9E9
| 65386 ||  || — || August 20, 2002 || Kvistaberg || UDAS || — || align=right | 6.6 km || 
|-id=387 bgcolor=#d6d6d6
| 65387 ||  || — || August 30, 2002 || Palomar || NEAT || HYG || align=right | 5.0 km || 
|-id=388 bgcolor=#E9E9E9
| 65388 ||  || — || August 30, 2002 || Anderson Mesa || LONEOS || MAR || align=right | 3.1 km || 
|-id=389 bgcolor=#d6d6d6
| 65389 ||  || — || September 4, 2002 || Anderson Mesa || LONEOS || SHU3:2 || align=right | 9.9 km || 
|-id=390 bgcolor=#fefefe
| 65390 ||  || — || September 4, 2002 || Anderson Mesa || LONEOS || — || align=right | 1.6 km || 
|-id=391 bgcolor=#E9E9E9
| 65391 ||  || — || September 4, 2002 || Anderson Mesa || LONEOS || — || align=right | 6.3 km || 
|-id=392 bgcolor=#fefefe
| 65392 ||  || — || September 5, 2002 || Anderson Mesa || LONEOS || V || align=right | 1.6 km || 
|-id=393 bgcolor=#E9E9E9
| 65393 ||  || — || September 3, 2002 || Haleakala || NEAT || — || align=right | 3.3 km || 
|-id=394 bgcolor=#E9E9E9
| 65394 ||  || — || September 5, 2002 || Socorro || LINEAR || — || align=right | 3.6 km || 
|-id=395 bgcolor=#E9E9E9
| 65395 ||  || — || September 5, 2002 || Socorro || LINEAR || — || align=right | 4.4 km || 
|-id=396 bgcolor=#E9E9E9
| 65396 ||  || — || September 4, 2002 || Anderson Mesa || LONEOS || — || align=right | 3.8 km || 
|-id=397 bgcolor=#fefefe
| 65397 ||  || — || September 5, 2002 || Anderson Mesa || LONEOS || — || align=right | 1.7 km || 
|-id=398 bgcolor=#d6d6d6
| 65398 ||  || — || September 5, 2002 || Socorro || LINEAR || — || align=right | 4.6 km || 
|-id=399 bgcolor=#E9E9E9
| 65399 ||  || — || September 5, 2002 || Socorro || LINEAR || — || align=right | 4.5 km || 
|-id=400 bgcolor=#d6d6d6
| 65400 ||  || — || September 5, 2002 || Socorro || LINEAR || — || align=right | 6.0 km || 
|}

65401–65500 

|-bgcolor=#fefefe
| 65401 ||  || — || September 5, 2002 || Socorro || LINEAR || NYS || align=right | 1.4 km || 
|-id=402 bgcolor=#d6d6d6
| 65402 ||  || — || September 5, 2002 || Socorro || LINEAR || — || align=right | 3.2 km || 
|-id=403 bgcolor=#E9E9E9
| 65403 ||  || — || September 5, 2002 || Socorro || LINEAR || — || align=right | 3.7 km || 
|-id=404 bgcolor=#E9E9E9
| 65404 ||  || — || September 5, 2002 || Socorro || LINEAR || — || align=right | 5.2 km || 
|-id=405 bgcolor=#E9E9E9
| 65405 ||  || — || September 5, 2002 || Socorro || LINEAR || — || align=right | 4.4 km || 
|-id=406 bgcolor=#E9E9E9
| 65406 ||  || — || September 7, 2002 || Socorro || LINEAR || — || align=right | 3.4 km || 
|-id=407 bgcolor=#C2E0FF
| 65407 ||  || — || September 4, 2002 || Anderson Mesa || LONEOS || damocloidunusualslowcritical || align=right | 15 km || 
|-id=408 bgcolor=#E9E9E9
| 65408 ||  || — || September 11, 2002 || Haleakala || NEAT || — || align=right | 4.1 km || 
|-id=409 bgcolor=#d6d6d6
| 65409 ||  || — || September 15, 2002 || Haleakala || NEAT || 7:4 || align=right | 7.5 km || 
|-id=410 bgcolor=#d6d6d6
| 65410 ||  || — || September 27, 2002 || Palomar || NEAT || — || align=right | 4.8 km || 
|-id=411 bgcolor=#E9E9E9
| 65411 ||  || — || September 28, 2002 || Haleakala || NEAT || — || align=right | 2.0 km || 
|-id=412 bgcolor=#E9E9E9
| 65412 ||  || — || September 30, 2002 || Socorro || LINEAR || — || align=right | 4.1 km || 
|-id=413 bgcolor=#d6d6d6
| 65413 ||  || — || October 2, 2002 || Socorro || LINEAR || THM || align=right | 4.8 km || 
|-id=414 bgcolor=#d6d6d6
| 65414 ||  || — || October 2, 2002 || Socorro || LINEAR || KOR || align=right | 3.0 km || 
|-id=415 bgcolor=#E9E9E9
| 65415 ||  || — || October 2, 2002 || Socorro || LINEAR || — || align=right | 2.4 km || 
|-id=416 bgcolor=#E9E9E9
| 65416 ||  || — || October 2, 2002 || Socorro || LINEAR || — || align=right | 4.1 km || 
|-id=417 bgcolor=#fefefe
| 65417 ||  || — || October 2, 2002 || Socorro || LINEAR || ERI || align=right | 3.1 km || 
|-id=418 bgcolor=#E9E9E9
| 65418 ||  || — || October 2, 2002 || Socorro || LINEAR || — || align=right | 4.1 km || 
|-id=419 bgcolor=#E9E9E9
| 65419 ||  || — || October 2, 2002 || Socorro || LINEAR || — || align=right | 2.4 km || 
|-id=420 bgcolor=#fefefe
| 65420 ||  || — || October 2, 2002 || Socorro || LINEAR || — || align=right | 1.4 km || 
|-id=421 bgcolor=#fefefe
| 65421 ||  || — || October 1, 2002 || Anderson Mesa || LONEOS || — || align=right | 2.3 km || 
|-id=422 bgcolor=#fefefe
| 65422 ||  || — || October 1, 2002 || Socorro || LINEAR || — || align=right | 3.1 km || 
|-id=423 bgcolor=#d6d6d6
| 65423 ||  || — || October 3, 2002 || Palomar || NEAT || — || align=right | 5.0 km || 
|-id=424 bgcolor=#d6d6d6
| 65424 ||  || — || October 3, 2002 || Socorro || LINEAR || — || align=right | 9.2 km || 
|-id=425 bgcolor=#FA8072
| 65425 ||  || — || October 4, 2002 || Palomar || NEAT || — || align=right | 1.3 km || 
|-id=426 bgcolor=#fefefe
| 65426 ||  || — || October 4, 2002 || Socorro || LINEAR || — || align=right | 2.2 km || 
|-id=427 bgcolor=#fefefe
| 65427 ||  || — || October 3, 2002 || Socorro || LINEAR || — || align=right | 1.6 km || 
|-id=428 bgcolor=#E9E9E9
| 65428 ||  || — || October 5, 2002 || Socorro || LINEAR || EUN || align=right | 5.2 km || 
|-id=429 bgcolor=#E9E9E9
| 65429 ||  || — || October 11, 2002 || Palomar || NEAT || — || align=right | 4.5 km || 
|-id=430 bgcolor=#fefefe
| 65430 ||  || — || October 14, 2002 || Socorro || LINEAR || — || align=right | 3.3 km || 
|-id=431 bgcolor=#E9E9E9
| 65431 ||  || — || October 4, 2002 || Socorro || LINEAR || — || align=right | 6.5 km || 
|-id=432 bgcolor=#E9E9E9
| 65432 ||  || — || October 6, 2002 || Socorro || LINEAR || — || align=right | 1.5 km || 
|-id=433 bgcolor=#FA8072
| 65433 ||  || — || October 7, 2002 || Socorro || LINEAR || — || align=right | 2.2 km || 
|-id=434 bgcolor=#E9E9E9
| 65434 ||  || — || October 9, 2002 || Anderson Mesa || LONEOS || MIT || align=right | 6.2 km || 
|-id=435 bgcolor=#fefefe
| 65435 ||  || — || October 8, 2002 || Anderson Mesa || LONEOS || — || align=right | 1.4 km || 
|-id=436 bgcolor=#fefefe
| 65436 ||  || — || October 9, 2002 || Socorro || LINEAR || — || align=right | 1.9 km || 
|-id=437 bgcolor=#E9E9E9
| 65437 ||  || — || October 9, 2002 || Socorro || LINEAR || MRX || align=right | 2.3 km || 
|-id=438 bgcolor=#d6d6d6
| 65438 ||  || — || October 10, 2002 || Socorro || LINEAR || URS || align=right | 6.8 km || 
|-id=439 bgcolor=#E9E9E9
| 65439 ||  || — || October 10, 2002 || Socorro || LINEAR || — || align=right | 6.6 km || 
|-id=440 bgcolor=#d6d6d6
| 65440 ||  || — || October 10, 2002 || Socorro || LINEAR || — || align=right | 6.1 km || 
|-id=441 bgcolor=#E9E9E9
| 65441 ||  || — || October 10, 2002 || Socorro || LINEAR || EUN || align=right | 3.4 km || 
|-id=442 bgcolor=#E9E9E9
| 65442 ||  || — || October 10, 2002 || Socorro || LINEAR || — || align=right | 4.8 km || 
|-id=443 bgcolor=#d6d6d6
| 65443 ||  || — || October 15, 2002 || Palomar || NEAT || EOS || align=right | 3.9 km || 
|-id=444 bgcolor=#fefefe
| 65444 ||  || — || October 31, 2002 || Palomar || NEAT || V || align=right | 1.4 km || 
|-id=445 bgcolor=#fefefe
| 65445 ||  || — || October 31, 2002 || Palomar || NEAT || — || align=right | 2.0 km || 
|-id=446 bgcolor=#d6d6d6
| 65446 ||  || — || November 5, 2002 || Socorro || LINEAR || — || align=right | 5.0 km || 
|-id=447 bgcolor=#d6d6d6
| 65447 ||  || — || November 5, 2002 || Socorro || LINEAR || — || align=right | 5.9 km || 
|-id=448 bgcolor=#d6d6d6
| 65448 ||  || — || November 5, 2002 || Kitt Peak || Spacewatch || THM || align=right | 4.9 km || 
|-id=449 bgcolor=#E9E9E9
| 65449 ||  || — || November 4, 2002 || Haleakala || NEAT || — || align=right | 5.6 km || 
|-id=450 bgcolor=#fefefe
| 65450 ||  || — || November 6, 2002 || Socorro || LINEAR || NYS || align=right | 1.4 km || 
|-id=451 bgcolor=#E9E9E9
| 65451 ||  || — || November 6, 2002 || Haleakala || NEAT || AGN || align=right | 2.8 km || 
|-id=452 bgcolor=#E9E9E9
| 65452 ||  || — || November 7, 2002 || Socorro || LINEAR || — || align=right | 3.8 km || 
|-id=453 bgcolor=#d6d6d6
| 65453 ||  || — || November 7, 2002 || Anderson Mesa || LONEOS || EOS || align=right | 5.8 km || 
|-id=454 bgcolor=#E9E9E9
| 65454 ||  || — || November 8, 2002 || Socorro || LINEAR || ADE || align=right | 7.7 km || 
|-id=455 bgcolor=#fefefe
| 65455 ||  || — || November 7, 2002 || Socorro || LINEAR || FLO || align=right | 1.2 km || 
|-id=456 bgcolor=#d6d6d6
| 65456 ||  || — || November 7, 2002 || Socorro || LINEAR || HYG || align=right | 6.1 km || 
|-id=457 bgcolor=#d6d6d6
| 65457 ||  || — || November 7, 2002 || Socorro || LINEAR || — || align=right | 5.2 km || 
|-id=458 bgcolor=#fefefe
| 65458 ||  || — || November 11, 2002 || Socorro || LINEAR || — || align=right | 2.2 km || 
|-id=459 bgcolor=#d6d6d6
| 65459 ||  || — || November 24, 2002 || Palomar || NEAT || KOR || align=right | 2.5 km || 
|-id=460 bgcolor=#E9E9E9
| 65460 ||  || — || November 27, 2002 || Anderson Mesa || LONEOS || — || align=right | 3.5 km || 
|-id=461 bgcolor=#E9E9E9
| 65461 ||  || — || November 28, 2002 || Fountain Hills || Fountain Hills Obs. || — || align=right | 6.5 km || 
|-id=462 bgcolor=#E9E9E9
| 65462 ||  || — || December 1, 2002 || Socorro || LINEAR || — || align=right | 2.5 km || 
|-id=463 bgcolor=#fefefe
| 65463 ||  || — || December 1, 2002 || Socorro || LINEAR || NYS || align=right | 4.0 km || 
|-id=464 bgcolor=#d6d6d6
| 65464 ||  || — || December 2, 2002 || Socorro || LINEAR || HYG || align=right | 5.5 km || 
|-id=465 bgcolor=#E9E9E9
| 65465 ||  || — || December 2, 2002 || Socorro || LINEAR || AGN || align=right | 2.8 km || 
|-id=466 bgcolor=#E9E9E9
| 65466 ||  || — || December 2, 2002 || Socorro || LINEAR || — || align=right | 2.3 km || 
|-id=467 bgcolor=#fefefe
| 65467 ||  || — || December 7, 2002 || Socorro || LINEAR || NYS || align=right | 1.9 km || 
|-id=468 bgcolor=#E9E9E9
| 65468 ||  || — || December 5, 2002 || Socorro || LINEAR || — || align=right | 2.8 km || 
|-id=469 bgcolor=#d6d6d6
| 65469 ||  || — || December 5, 2002 || Kitt Peak || Spacewatch || — || align=right | 6.4 km || 
|-id=470 bgcolor=#fefefe
| 65470 ||  || — || December 8, 2002 || Haleakala || NEAT || — || align=right | 2.2 km || 
|-id=471 bgcolor=#d6d6d6
| 65471 ||  || — || December 27, 2002 || Anderson Mesa || LONEOS || — || align=right | 8.7 km || 
|-id=472 bgcolor=#fefefe
| 65472 ||  || — || December 30, 2002 || Socorro || LINEAR || V || align=right | 1.8 km || 
|-id=473 bgcolor=#d6d6d6
| 65473 ||  || — || December 31, 2002 || Socorro || LINEAR || — || align=right | 5.6 km || 
|-id=474 bgcolor=#E9E9E9
| 65474 ||  || — || January 1, 2003 || Socorro || LINEAR || — || align=right | 5.6 km || 
|-id=475 bgcolor=#E9E9E9
| 65475 ||  || — || January 4, 2003 || Socorro || LINEAR || — || align=right | 1.7 km || 
|-id=476 bgcolor=#fefefe
| 65476 ||  || — || January 4, 2003 || Socorro || LINEAR || — || align=right | 1.5 km || 
|-id=477 bgcolor=#d6d6d6
| 65477 ||  || — || January 7, 2003 || Socorro || LINEAR || — || align=right | 4.2 km || 
|-id=478 bgcolor=#E9E9E9
| 65478 ||  || — || January 5, 2003 || Socorro || LINEAR || — || align=right | 2.1 km || 
|-id=479 bgcolor=#d6d6d6
| 65479 ||  || — || January 10, 2003 || Socorro || LINEAR || — || align=right | 6.4 km || 
|-id=480 bgcolor=#fefefe
| 65480 ||  || — || January 26, 2003 || Anderson Mesa || LONEOS || — || align=right | 1.5 km || 
|-id=481 bgcolor=#fefefe
| 65481 ||  || — || January 28, 2003 || Kitt Peak || Spacewatch || — || align=right | 1.7 km || 
|-id=482 bgcolor=#E9E9E9
| 65482 ||  || — || January 28, 2003 || Socorro || LINEAR || — || align=right | 3.9 km || 
|-id=483 bgcolor=#fefefe
| 65483 ||  || — || January 31, 2003 || Socorro || LINEAR || FLO || align=right | 1.2 km || 
|-id=484 bgcolor=#fefefe
| 65484 ||  || — || January 30, 2003 || Socorro || LINEAR || — || align=right | 1.6 km || 
|-id=485 bgcolor=#E9E9E9
| 65485 ||  || — || February 2, 2003 || Socorro || LINEAR || — || align=right | 1.5 km || 
|-id=486 bgcolor=#fefefe
| 65486 ||  || — || February 8, 2003 || Socorro || LINEAR || NYS || align=right | 1.2 km || 
|-id=487 bgcolor=#E9E9E9
| 65487 Divinacommedia ||  ||  || February 9, 2003 || La Silla || G. Masi || — || align=right | 3.0 km || 
|-id=488 bgcolor=#d6d6d6
| 65488 ||  || — || February 22, 2003 || Palomar || NEAT || — || align=right | 4.7 km || 
|-id=489 bgcolor=#C2E0FF
| 65489 Ceto ||  ||  || March 22, 2003 || Palomar || C. Trujillo, M. E. Brown || centaurmooncritical || align=right | 227 km || 
|-id=490 bgcolor=#fefefe
| 65490 || 2062 P-L || — || September 24, 1960 || Palomar || PLS || — || align=right | 3.8 km || 
|-id=491 bgcolor=#fefefe
| 65491 || 2084 P-L || — || September 24, 1960 || Palomar || PLS || — || align=right | 1.6 km || 
|-id=492 bgcolor=#d6d6d6
| 65492 || 2104 P-L || — || September 24, 1960 || Palomar || PLS || EUP || align=right | 8.2 km || 
|-id=493 bgcolor=#fefefe
| 65493 || 2119 P-L || — || September 24, 1960 || Palomar || PLS || V || align=right | 1.4 km || 
|-id=494 bgcolor=#d6d6d6
| 65494 || 2123 P-L || — || September 24, 1960 || Palomar || PLS || VER || align=right | 6.6 km || 
|-id=495 bgcolor=#E9E9E9
| 65495 || 2200 P-L || — || September 24, 1960 || Palomar || PLS || — || align=right | 2.4 km || 
|-id=496 bgcolor=#fefefe
| 65496 || 2211 P-L || — || September 24, 1960 || Palomar || PLS || ERI || align=right | 3.9 km || 
|-id=497 bgcolor=#fefefe
| 65497 || 2606 P-L || — || September 24, 1960 || Palomar || PLS || NYS || align=right | 4.5 km || 
|-id=498 bgcolor=#fefefe
| 65498 || 2647 P-L || — || September 24, 1960 || Palomar || PLS || MAS || align=right | 2.4 km || 
|-id=499 bgcolor=#fefefe
| 65499 || 2650 P-L || — || September 24, 1960 || Palomar || PLS || — || align=right | 1.3 km || 
|-id=500 bgcolor=#fefefe
| 65500 || 2759 P-L || — || September 24, 1960 || Palomar || PLS || MAS || align=right | 1.4 km || 
|}

65501–65600 

|-bgcolor=#fefefe
| 65501 || 2766 P-L || — || September 24, 1960 || Palomar || PLS || NYS || align=right | 1.5 km || 
|-id=502 bgcolor=#d6d6d6
| 65502 || 2856 P-L || — || September 24, 1960 || Palomar || PLS || HYG || align=right | 9.2 km || 
|-id=503 bgcolor=#E9E9E9
| 65503 || 3028 P-L || — || September 24, 1960 || Palomar || PLS || — || align=right | 4.4 km || 
|-id=504 bgcolor=#fefefe
| 65504 || 3544 P-L || — || October 17, 1960 || Palomar || PLS || V || align=right | 2.1 km || 
|-id=505 bgcolor=#E9E9E9
| 65505 || 4085 P-L || — || September 24, 1960 || Palomar || PLS || EUN || align=right | 2.9 km || 
|-id=506 bgcolor=#fefefe
| 65506 || 4102 P-L || — || September 24, 1960 || Palomar || PLS || — || align=right | 1.6 km || 
|-id=507 bgcolor=#fefefe
| 65507 || 4151 P-L || — || September 24, 1960 || Palomar || PLS || — || align=right | 1.8 km || 
|-id=508 bgcolor=#d6d6d6
| 65508 || 4179 P-L || — || September 24, 1960 || Palomar || PLS || HYG || align=right | 5.9 km || 
|-id=509 bgcolor=#E9E9E9
| 65509 || 4186 P-L || — || September 24, 1960 || Palomar || PLS || — || align=right | 2.0 km || 
|-id=510 bgcolor=#d6d6d6
| 65510 || 4241 P-L || — || September 24, 1960 || Palomar || PLS || NAE || align=right | 5.6 km || 
|-id=511 bgcolor=#d6d6d6
| 65511 || 4243 P-L || — || September 24, 1960 || Palomar || PLS || — || align=right | 4.4 km || 
|-id=512 bgcolor=#d6d6d6
| 65512 || 4246 P-L || — || September 24, 1960 || Palomar || PLS || HYG || align=right | 7.2 km || 
|-id=513 bgcolor=#fefefe
| 65513 || 4258 P-L || — || September 24, 1960 || Palomar || PLS || V || align=right | 1.6 km || 
|-id=514 bgcolor=#E9E9E9
| 65514 || 4270 P-L || — || September 24, 1960 || Palomar || PLS || — || align=right | 2.6 km || 
|-id=515 bgcolor=#fefefe
| 65515 || 4712 P-L || — || September 24, 1960 || Palomar || PLS || NYS || align=right | 2.1 km || 
|-id=516 bgcolor=#fefefe
| 65516 || 4726 P-L || — || September 24, 1960 || Palomar || PLS || NYS || align=right | 1.4 km || 
|-id=517 bgcolor=#d6d6d6
| 65517 || 4759 P-L || — || September 24, 1960 || Palomar || PLS || THM || align=right | 3.1 km || 
|-id=518 bgcolor=#fefefe
| 65518 || 4838 P-L || — || September 24, 1960 || Palomar || PLS || — || align=right | 2.1 km || 
|-id=519 bgcolor=#fefefe
| 65519 || 4853 P-L || — || September 24, 1960 || Palomar || PLS || — || align=right | 1.7 km || 
|-id=520 bgcolor=#fefefe
| 65520 || 4857 P-L || — || September 24, 1960 || Palomar || PLS || — || align=right | 1.5 km || 
|-id=521 bgcolor=#d6d6d6
| 65521 || 4894 P-L || — || September 24, 1960 || Palomar || PLS || NAE || align=right | 4.9 km || 
|-id=522 bgcolor=#d6d6d6
| 65522 || 5570 P-L || — || October 22, 1960 || Palomar || PLS || — || align=right | 9.1 km || 
|-id=523 bgcolor=#E9E9E9
| 65523 || 5578 P-L || — || September 24, 1960 || Palomar || PLS || — || align=right | 3.9 km || 
|-id=524 bgcolor=#d6d6d6
| 65524 || 5585 P-L || — || October 22, 1960 || Palomar || PLS || — || align=right | 4.9 km || 
|-id=525 bgcolor=#E9E9E9
| 65525 || 6052 P-L || — || September 24, 1960 || Palomar || PLS || — || align=right | 3.0 km || 
|-id=526 bgcolor=#fefefe
| 65526 || 6075 P-L || — || September 24, 1960 || Palomar || PLS || — || align=right | 1.5 km || 
|-id=527 bgcolor=#E9E9E9
| 65527 || 6099 P-L || — || September 24, 1960 || Palomar || PLS || — || align=right | 4.0 km || 
|-id=528 bgcolor=#d6d6d6
| 65528 || 6118 P-L || — || September 24, 1960 || Palomar || PLS || ALA || align=right | 7.6 km || 
|-id=529 bgcolor=#E9E9E9
| 65529 || 6200 P-L || — || September 24, 1960 || Palomar || PLS || — || align=right | 3.5 km || 
|-id=530 bgcolor=#fefefe
| 65530 || 6216 P-L || — || September 24, 1960 || Palomar || PLS || V || align=right | 1.3 km || 
|-id=531 bgcolor=#d6d6d6
| 65531 || 6296 P-L || — || September 24, 1960 || Palomar || PLS || — || align=right | 6.7 km || 
|-id=532 bgcolor=#d6d6d6
| 65532 || 6389 P-L || — || September 24, 1960 || Palomar || PLS || — || align=right | 5.5 km || 
|-id=533 bgcolor=#d6d6d6
| 65533 || 6592 P-L || — || September 24, 1960 || Palomar || PLS || — || align=right | 6.7 km || 
|-id=534 bgcolor=#d6d6d6
| 65534 || 6711 P-L || — || September 24, 1960 || Palomar || PLS || KOR || align=right | 2.9 km || 
|-id=535 bgcolor=#fefefe
| 65535 || 6773 P-L || — || September 24, 1960 || Palomar || PLS || NYS || align=right | 1.6 km || 
|-id=536 bgcolor=#d6d6d6
| 65536 || 6826 P-L || — || September 24, 1960 || Palomar || PLS || 628 || align=right | 5.9 km || 
|-id=537 bgcolor=#E9E9E9
| 65537 || 6855 P-L || — || September 24, 1960 || Palomar || PLS || — || align=right | 1.8 km || 
|-id=538 bgcolor=#E9E9E9
| 65538 || 7561 P-L || — || October 17, 1960 || Palomar || PLS || — || align=right | 3.9 km || 
|-id=539 bgcolor=#d6d6d6
| 65539 || 7562 P-L || — || October 17, 1960 || Palomar || PLS || — || align=right | 3.6 km || 
|-id=540 bgcolor=#fefefe
| 65540 || 7628 P-L || — || October 17, 1960 || Palomar || PLS || KLI || align=right | 5.5 km || 
|-id=541 bgcolor=#d6d6d6
| 65541 Kasbek || 9593 P-L ||  || October 17, 1960 || Palomar || PLS || 2:1J || align=right | 10 km || 
|-id=542 bgcolor=#fefefe
| 65542 || 1143 T-1 || — || March 25, 1971 || Palomar || PLS || — || align=right | 2.4 km || 
|-id=543 bgcolor=#E9E9E9
| 65543 || 1223 T-1 || — || March 25, 1971 || Palomar || PLS || — || align=right | 4.5 km || 
|-id=544 bgcolor=#E9E9E9
| 65544 || 2233 T-1 || — || March 25, 1971 || Palomar || PLS || — || align=right | 6.6 km || 
|-id=545 bgcolor=#fefefe
| 65545 || 2235 T-1 || — || March 25, 1971 || Palomar || PLS || — || align=right | 1.9 km || 
|-id=546 bgcolor=#fefefe
| 65546 || 3256 T-1 || — || March 26, 1971 || Palomar || PLS || NYS || align=right | 1.9 km || 
|-id=547 bgcolor=#d6d6d6
| 65547 || 3337 T-1 || — || March 26, 1971 || Palomar || PLS || HYG || align=right | 5.5 km || 
|-id=548 bgcolor=#E9E9E9
| 65548 || 4311 T-1 || — || March 26, 1971 || Palomar || PLS || — || align=right | 3.5 km || 
|-id=549 bgcolor=#E9E9E9
| 65549 || 4869 T-1 || — || May 13, 1971 || Palomar || PLS || — || align=right | 7.8 km || 
|-id=550 bgcolor=#fefefe
| 65550 || 1062 T-2 || — || September 29, 1973 || Palomar || PLS || NYS || align=right | 1.2 km || 
|-id=551 bgcolor=#E9E9E9
| 65551 || 1206 T-2 || — || September 29, 1973 || Palomar || PLS || — || align=right | 2.1 km || 
|-id=552 bgcolor=#fefefe
| 65552 || 1261 T-2 || — || September 29, 1973 || Palomar || PLS || — || align=right | 1.7 km || 
|-id=553 bgcolor=#fefefe
| 65553 || 1297 T-2 || — || September 29, 1973 || Palomar || PLS || — || align=right | 1.9 km || 
|-id=554 bgcolor=#d6d6d6
| 65554 || 1350 T-2 || — || September 29, 1973 || Palomar || PLS || — || align=right | 5.0 km || 
|-id=555 bgcolor=#E9E9E9
| 65555 || 1464 T-2 || — || September 29, 1973 || Palomar || PLS || — || align=right | 1.8 km || 
|-id=556 bgcolor=#fefefe
| 65556 || 1541 T-2 || — || September 29, 1973 || Palomar || PLS || NYS || align=right | 1.5 km || 
|-id=557 bgcolor=#d6d6d6
| 65557 || 1606 T-2 || — || September 24, 1973 || Palomar || PLS || — || align=right | 7.2 km || 
|-id=558 bgcolor=#fefefe
| 65558 || 1611 T-2 || — || September 24, 1973 || Palomar || PLS || FLO || align=right | 1.4 km || 
|-id=559 bgcolor=#fefefe
| 65559 || 2065 T-2 || — || September 29, 1973 || Palomar || PLS || — || align=right | 1.7 km || 
|-id=560 bgcolor=#d6d6d6
| 65560 || 2175 T-2 || — || September 29, 1973 || Palomar || PLS || — || align=right | 7.2 km || 
|-id=561 bgcolor=#fefefe
| 65561 || 2195 T-2 || — || September 29, 1973 || Palomar || PLS || — || align=right | 1.6 km || 
|-id=562 bgcolor=#fefefe
| 65562 || 2219 T-2 || — || September 29, 1973 || Palomar || PLS || NYS || align=right | 1.9 km || 
|-id=563 bgcolor=#d6d6d6
| 65563 || 2238 T-2 || — || September 29, 1973 || Palomar || PLS || — || align=right | 6.6 km || 
|-id=564 bgcolor=#d6d6d6
| 65564 || 2264 T-2 || — || September 29, 1973 || Palomar || PLS || EOS || align=right | 6.1 km || 
|-id=565 bgcolor=#E9E9E9
| 65565 || 2300 T-2 || — || September 29, 1973 || Palomar || PLS || GEF || align=right | 2.0 km || 
|-id=566 bgcolor=#d6d6d6
| 65566 || 3022 T-2 || — || September 30, 1973 || Palomar || PLS || — || align=right | 6.4 km || 
|-id=567 bgcolor=#E9E9E9
| 65567 || 3039 T-2 || — || September 30, 1973 || Palomar || PLS || — || align=right | 1.6 km || 
|-id=568 bgcolor=#E9E9E9
| 65568 || 3105 T-2 || — || September 30, 1973 || Palomar || PLS || — || align=right | 3.9 km || 
|-id=569 bgcolor=#E9E9E9
| 65569 || 3127 T-2 || — || September 30, 1973 || Palomar || PLS || — || align=right | 4.1 km || 
|-id=570 bgcolor=#E9E9E9
| 65570 || 3139 T-2 || — || September 30, 1973 || Palomar || PLS || — || align=right | 3.8 km || 
|-id=571 bgcolor=#d6d6d6
| 65571 || 3165 T-2 || — || September 30, 1973 || Palomar || PLS || — || align=right | 4.3 km || 
|-id=572 bgcolor=#fefefe
| 65572 || 3173 T-2 || — || September 30, 1973 || Palomar || PLS || FLO || align=right | 1.4 km || 
|-id=573 bgcolor=#fefefe
| 65573 || 3203 T-2 || — || September 30, 1973 || Palomar || PLS || V || align=right | 1.8 km || 
|-id=574 bgcolor=#fefefe
| 65574 || 3229 T-2 || — || September 30, 1973 || Palomar || PLS || MAS || align=right | 1.9 km || 
|-id=575 bgcolor=#d6d6d6
| 65575 || 3245 T-2 || — || September 30, 1973 || Palomar || PLS || EOS || align=right | 3.6 km || 
|-id=576 bgcolor=#fefefe
| 65576 || 3277 T-2 || — || September 30, 1973 || Palomar || PLS || FLO || align=right | 1.8 km || 
|-id=577 bgcolor=#d6d6d6
| 65577 || 3324 T-2 || — || September 25, 1973 || Palomar || PLS || — || align=right | 4.2 km || 
|-id=578 bgcolor=#d6d6d6
| 65578 || 4137 T-2 || — || September 29, 1973 || Palomar || PLS || CHA || align=right | 4.5 km || 
|-id=579 bgcolor=#fefefe
| 65579 || 4173 T-2 || — || September 29, 1973 || Palomar || PLS || V || align=right | 1.4 km || 
|-id=580 bgcolor=#d6d6d6
| 65580 || 4181 T-2 || — || September 29, 1973 || Palomar || PLS || — || align=right | 6.6 km || 
|-id=581 bgcolor=#fefefe
| 65581 || 4275 T-2 || — || September 29, 1973 || Palomar || PLS || — || align=right | 1.7 km || 
|-id=582 bgcolor=#d6d6d6
| 65582 || 4362 T-2 || — || September 30, 1973 || Palomar || PLS || HYG || align=right | 5.0 km || 
|-id=583 bgcolor=#C2FFFF
| 65583 Theoklymenos || 4646 T-2 ||  || September 30, 1973 || Palomar || PLS || L4 || align=right | 15 km || 
|-id=584 bgcolor=#E9E9E9
| 65584 || 5051 T-2 || — || September 25, 1973 || Palomar || PLS || — || align=right | 2.0 km || 
|-id=585 bgcolor=#d6d6d6
| 65585 || 5064 T-2 || — || September 25, 1973 || Palomar || PLS || — || align=right | 6.4 km || 
|-id=586 bgcolor=#E9E9E9
| 65586 || 5160 T-2 || — || September 25, 1973 || Palomar || PLS || — || align=right | 3.8 km || 
|-id=587 bgcolor=#d6d6d6
| 65587 || 1033 T-3 || — || October 17, 1977 || Palomar || PLS || URS || align=right | 5.5 km || 
|-id=588 bgcolor=#E9E9E9
| 65588 || 1086 T-3 || — || October 17, 1977 || Palomar || PLS || — || align=right | 2.5 km || 
|-id=589 bgcolor=#d6d6d6
| 65589 || 1122 T-3 || — || October 17, 1977 || Palomar || PLS || VER || align=right | 6.9 km || 
|-id=590 bgcolor=#C2FFFF
| 65590 Archeptolemos || 1305 T-3 ||  || October 17, 1977 || Palomar || PLS || L5 || align=right | 20 km || 
|-id=591 bgcolor=#fefefe
| 65591 || 2147 T-3 || — || October 16, 1977 || Palomar || PLS || — || align=right | 2.7 km || 
|-id=592 bgcolor=#d6d6d6
| 65592 || 2155 T-3 || — || October 16, 1977 || Palomar || PLS || — || align=right | 7.5 km || 
|-id=593 bgcolor=#fefefe
| 65593 || 2375 T-3 || — || October 16, 1977 || Palomar || PLS || — || align=right | 2.9 km || 
|-id=594 bgcolor=#E9E9E9
| 65594 || 2396 T-3 || — || October 16, 1977 || Palomar || PLS || — || align=right | 2.4 km || 
|-id=595 bgcolor=#d6d6d6
| 65595 || 2430 T-3 || — || October 16, 1977 || Palomar || PLS || URS || align=right | 9.6 km || 
|-id=596 bgcolor=#E9E9E9
| 65596 || 3033 T-3 || — || October 16, 1977 || Palomar || PLS || GEF || align=right | 3.5 km || 
|-id=597 bgcolor=#fefefe
| 65597 || 3047 T-3 || — || October 16, 1977 || Palomar || PLS || — || align=right | 2.7 km || 
|-id=598 bgcolor=#fefefe
| 65598 || 3059 T-3 || — || October 16, 1977 || Palomar || PLS || V || align=right | 1.2 km || 
|-id=599 bgcolor=#E9E9E9
| 65599 || 3079 T-3 || — || October 16, 1977 || Palomar || PLS || DOR || align=right | 5.7 km || 
|-id=600 bgcolor=#d6d6d6
| 65600 || 3121 T-3 || — || October 16, 1977 || Palomar || PLS || — || align=right | 4.2 km || 
|}

65601–65700 

|-bgcolor=#d6d6d6
| 65601 || 3159 T-3 || — || October 16, 1977 || Palomar || PLS || — || align=right | 4.7 km || 
|-id=602 bgcolor=#fefefe
| 65602 || 3192 T-3 || — || October 16, 1977 || Palomar || PLS || — || align=right | 1.9 km || 
|-id=603 bgcolor=#E9E9E9
| 65603 || 3229 T-3 || — || October 16, 1977 || Palomar || PLS || — || align=right | 3.2 km || 
|-id=604 bgcolor=#fefefe
| 65604 || 3235 T-3 || — || October 16, 1977 || Palomar || PLS || V || align=right | 1.4 km || 
|-id=605 bgcolor=#fefefe
| 65605 || 3245 T-3 || — || October 16, 1977 || Palomar || PLS || NYS || align=right | 1.7 km || 
|-id=606 bgcolor=#d6d6d6
| 65606 || 3315 T-3 || — || October 16, 1977 || Palomar || PLS || — || align=right | 5.6 km || 
|-id=607 bgcolor=#d6d6d6
| 65607 || 3360 T-3 || — || October 16, 1977 || Palomar || PLS || THM || align=right | 4.9 km || 
|-id=608 bgcolor=#fefefe
| 65608 || 3441 T-3 || — || October 16, 1977 || Palomar || PLS || — || align=right | 2.1 km || 
|-id=609 bgcolor=#fefefe
| 65609 || 3445 T-3 || — || October 16, 1977 || Palomar || PLS || — || align=right | 1.0 km || 
|-id=610 bgcolor=#E9E9E9
| 65610 || 3470 T-3 || — || October 16, 1977 || Palomar || PLS || — || align=right | 4.4 km || 
|-id=611 bgcolor=#d6d6d6
| 65611 || 3498 T-3 || — || October 16, 1977 || Palomar || PLS || KOR || align=right | 3.4 km || 
|-id=612 bgcolor=#d6d6d6
| 65612 || 3564 T-3 || — || October 16, 1977 || Palomar || PLS || EOS || align=right | 3.9 km || 
|-id=613 bgcolor=#E9E9E9
| 65613 || 3923 T-3 || — || October 16, 1977 || Palomar || PLS || HOF || align=right | 5.1 km || 
|-id=614 bgcolor=#E9E9E9
| 65614 || 4096 T-3 || — || October 16, 1977 || Palomar || PLS || AGN || align=right | 2.9 km || 
|-id=615 bgcolor=#fefefe
| 65615 || 4163 T-3 || — || October 16, 1977 || Palomar || PLS || V || align=right | 1.3 km || 
|-id=616 bgcolor=#fefefe
| 65616 || 4165 T-3 || — || October 16, 1977 || Palomar || PLS || — || align=right | 2.4 km || 
|-id=617 bgcolor=#E9E9E9
| 65617 || 4172 T-3 || — || October 16, 1977 || Palomar || PLS || — || align=right | 4.8 km || 
|-id=618 bgcolor=#fefefe
| 65618 || 4217 T-3 || — || October 16, 1977 || Palomar || PLS || — || align=right | 2.4 km || 
|-id=619 bgcolor=#fefefe
| 65619 || 4218 T-3 || — || October 16, 1977 || Palomar || PLS || — || align=right | 1.5 km || 
|-id=620 bgcolor=#E9E9E9
| 65620 || 4238 T-3 || — || October 16, 1977 || Palomar || PLS || HOF || align=right | 5.1 km || 
|-id=621 bgcolor=#d6d6d6
| 65621 || 4247 T-3 || — || October 16, 1977 || Palomar || PLS || ALA || align=right | 9.3 km || 
|-id=622 bgcolor=#E9E9E9
| 65622 || 4287 T-3 || — || October 16, 1977 || Palomar || PLS || — || align=right | 6.6 km || 
|-id=623 bgcolor=#fefefe
| 65623 || 4297 T-3 || — || October 16, 1977 || Palomar || PLS || — || align=right | 2.7 km || 
|-id=624 bgcolor=#E9E9E9
| 65624 || 4347 T-3 || — || October 16, 1977 || Palomar || PLS || HOF || align=right | 6.0 km || 
|-id=625 bgcolor=#fefefe
| 65625 || 4377 T-3 || — || October 16, 1977 || Palomar || PLS || — || align=right | 2.8 km || 
|-id=626 bgcolor=#fefefe
| 65626 || 5052 T-3 || — || October 16, 1977 || Palomar || PLS || — || align=right | 2.9 km || 
|-id=627 bgcolor=#E9E9E9
| 65627 || 5090 T-3 || — || October 16, 1977 || Palomar || PLS || GEF || align=right | 3.1 km || 
|-id=628 bgcolor=#fefefe
| 65628 || 5098 T-3 || — || October 16, 1977 || Palomar || PLS || FLO || align=right | 1.6 km || 
|-id=629 bgcolor=#fefefe
| 65629 || 5118 T-3 || — || October 16, 1977 || Palomar || PLS || — || align=right | 2.0 km || 
|-id=630 bgcolor=#fefefe
| 65630 || 5134 T-3 || — || October 16, 1977 || Palomar || PLS || FLO || align=right | 1.5 km || 
|-id=631 bgcolor=#d6d6d6
| 65631 || 5143 T-3 || — || October 16, 1977 || Palomar || PLS || BRA || align=right | 2.8 km || 
|-id=632 bgcolor=#d6d6d6
| 65632 || 5177 T-3 || — || October 16, 1977 || Palomar || PLS || — || align=right | 3.7 km || 
|-id=633 bgcolor=#d6d6d6
| 65633 || 5291 T-3 || — || October 17, 1977 || Palomar || PLS || — || align=right | 9.8 km || 
|-id=634 bgcolor=#d6d6d6
| 65634 || 5644 T-3 || — || October 16, 1977 || Palomar || PLS || — || align=right | 6.8 km || 
|-id=635 bgcolor=#E9E9E9
| 65635 ||  || — || March 12, 1977 || Kiso || H. Kosai, K. Furukawa || MAR || align=right | 2.9 km || 
|-id=636 bgcolor=#fefefe
| 65636 ||  || — || June 24, 1979 || Siding Spring || E. F. Helin, S. J. Bus || — || align=right | 1.8 km || 
|-id=637 bgcolor=#fefefe
| 65637 Tsniimash ||  ||  || November 14, 1979 || Nauchnyj || L. V. Zhuravleva || Hslow || align=right | 2.3 km || 
|-id=638 bgcolor=#E9E9E9
| 65638 ||  || — || February 28, 1981 || Siding Spring || S. J. Bus || — || align=right | 5.3 km || 
|-id=639 bgcolor=#E9E9E9
| 65639 ||  || — || February 28, 1981 || Siding Spring || S. J. Bus || — || align=right | 4.5 km || 
|-id=640 bgcolor=#E9E9E9
| 65640 ||  || — || February 28, 1981 || Siding Spring || S. J. Bus || HNS || align=right | 2.9 km || 
|-id=641 bgcolor=#E9E9E9
| 65641 ||  || — || February 28, 1981 || Siding Spring || S. J. Bus || — || align=right | 3.1 km || 
|-id=642 bgcolor=#fefefe
| 65642 ||  || — || March 2, 1981 || Siding Spring || S. J. Bus || — || align=right | 2.1 km || 
|-id=643 bgcolor=#fefefe
| 65643 ||  || — || March 1, 1981 || Siding Spring || S. J. Bus || — || align=right | 1.7 km || 
|-id=644 bgcolor=#fefefe
| 65644 ||  || — || March 1, 1981 || Siding Spring || S. J. Bus || V || align=right | 1.4 km || 
|-id=645 bgcolor=#fefefe
| 65645 ||  || — || March 1, 1981 || Siding Spring || S. J. Bus || V || align=right | 1.8 km || 
|-id=646 bgcolor=#fefefe
| 65646 ||  || — || March 1, 1981 || Siding Spring || S. J. Bus || H || align=right | 1.8 km || 
|-id=647 bgcolor=#fefefe
| 65647 ||  || — || March 1, 1981 || Siding Spring || S. J. Bus || PHO || align=right | 2.9 km || 
|-id=648 bgcolor=#fefefe
| 65648 ||  || — || March 7, 1981 || Siding Spring || S. J. Bus || — || align=right | 2.1 km || 
|-id=649 bgcolor=#E9E9E9
| 65649 ||  || — || March 1, 1981 || Siding Spring || S. J. Bus || — || align=right | 3.1 km || 
|-id=650 bgcolor=#fefefe
| 65650 ||  || — || March 2, 1981 || Siding Spring || S. J. Bus || V || align=right | 1.8 km || 
|-id=651 bgcolor=#d6d6d6
| 65651 ||  || — || March 2, 1981 || Siding Spring || S. J. Bus || — || align=right | 6.1 km || 
|-id=652 bgcolor=#fefefe
| 65652 ||  || — || March 2, 1981 || Siding Spring || S. J. Bus || NYS || align=right | 1.3 km || 
|-id=653 bgcolor=#fefefe
| 65653 ||  || — || March 7, 1981 || Siding Spring || S. J. Bus || — || align=right | 1.5 km || 
|-id=654 bgcolor=#fefefe
| 65654 ||  || — || March 2, 1981 || Siding Spring || S. J. Bus || — || align=right | 1.9 km || 
|-id=655 bgcolor=#E9E9E9
| 65655 ||  || — || March 2, 1981 || Siding Spring || S. J. Bus || — || align=right | 3.4 km || 
|-id=656 bgcolor=#E9E9E9
| 65656 ||  || — || September 1, 1981 || La Silla || H. Debehogne || — || align=right | 4.2 km || 
|-id=657 bgcolor=#E9E9E9
| 65657 Hube ||  ||  || August 16, 1982 || Siding Spring || A. Lowe || — || align=right | 7.0 km || 
|-id=658 bgcolor=#E9E9E9
| 65658 Gurnikovskaya ||  ||  || October 20, 1982 || Nauchnyj || L. G. Karachkina || — || align=right | 2.5 km || 
|-id=659 bgcolor=#E9E9E9
| 65659 || 1983 XE || — || December 1, 1983 || Anderson Mesa || E. Bowell || — || align=right | 4.0 km || 
|-id=660 bgcolor=#E9E9E9
| 65660 ||  || — || August 14, 1985 || Caussols || CERGA || — || align=right | 6.5 km || 
|-id=661 bgcolor=#d6d6d6
| 65661 ||  || — || November 1, 1985 || La Silla || R. M. West || — || align=right | 8.8 km || 
|-id=662 bgcolor=#fefefe
| 65662 ||  || — || August 26, 1986 || La Silla || H. Debehogne || — || align=right | 2.2 km || 
|-id=663 bgcolor=#fefefe
| 65663 ||  || — || August 29, 1986 || La Silla || H. Debehogne || — || align=right | 3.6 km || 
|-id=664 bgcolor=#E9E9E9
| 65664 ||  || — || September 4, 1986 || La Silla || H. Debehogne || — || align=right | 3.2 km || 
|-id=665 bgcolor=#d6d6d6
| 65665 ||  || — || September 9, 1986 || La Silla || H. Debehogne || — || align=right | 11 km || 
|-id=666 bgcolor=#fefefe
| 65666 || 1987 RU || — || September 12, 1987 || La Silla || H. Debehogne || — || align=right | 2.3 km || 
|-id=667 bgcolor=#d6d6d6
| 65667 ||  || — || September 30, 1987 || Brorfelde || P. Jensen || INA || align=right | 9.4 km || 
|-id=668 bgcolor=#E9E9E9
| 65668 ||  || — || January 14, 1988 || Kleť || A. Mrkos || — || align=right | 6.6 km || 
|-id=669 bgcolor=#E9E9E9
| 65669 ||  || — || February 13, 1988 || La Silla || E. W. Elst || — || align=right | 5.4 km || 
|-id=670 bgcolor=#E9E9E9
| 65670 ||  || — || February 13, 1988 || La Silla || E. W. Elst || ADE || align=right | 6.1 km || 
|-id=671 bgcolor=#E9E9E9
| 65671 ||  || — || February 22, 1988 || Siding Spring || R. H. McNaught || — || align=right | 3.2 km || 
|-id=672 bgcolor=#fefefe
| 65672 Merrick || 1988 QD ||  || August 16, 1988 || Palomar || C. S. Shoemaker, E. M. Shoemaker || — || align=right | 1.9 km || 
|-id=673 bgcolor=#fefefe
| 65673 ||  || — || September 1, 1988 || La Silla || H. Debehogne || — || align=right | 5.7 km || 
|-id=674 bgcolor=#FFC2E0
| 65674 || 1988 SM || — || September 29, 1988 || Siding Spring || M. Hartley || AMO +1km || align=right data-sort-value="0.83" | 830 m || 
|-id=675 bgcolor=#d6d6d6
| 65675 Mohr-Gruber ||  ||  || January 11, 1989 || Tautenburg Observatory || F. Börngen || THM || align=right | 7.9 km || 
|-id=676 bgcolor=#d6d6d6
| 65676 ||  || — || February 4, 1989 || La Silla || E. W. Elst || TIR || align=right | 12 km || 
|-id=677 bgcolor=#d6d6d6
| 65677 ||  || — || March 1, 1989 || Yorii || M. Arai, H. Mori || — || align=right | 16 km || 
|-id=678 bgcolor=#fefefe
| 65678 ||  || — || September 26, 1989 || La Silla || E. W. Elst || NYS || align=right | 1.6 km || 
|-id=679 bgcolor=#FFC2E0
| 65679 || 1989 UQ || — || October 26, 1989 || Caussols || C. Pollas || ATEPHA || align=right data-sort-value="0.92" | 920 m || 
|-id=680 bgcolor=#E9E9E9
| 65680 ||  || — || March 2, 1990 || La Silla || E. W. Elst || — || align=right | 4.6 km || 
|-id=681 bgcolor=#E9E9E9
| 65681 ||  || — || March 2, 1990 || La Silla || E. W. Elst || — || align=right | 2.0 km || 
|-id=682 bgcolor=#FA8072
| 65682 ||  || — || August 24, 1990 || Palomar || H. E. Holt || — || align=right | 1.9 km || 
|-id=683 bgcolor=#E9E9E9
| 65683 ||  || — || August 29, 1990 || Palomar || H. E. Holt || — || align=right | 4.9 km || 
|-id=684 bgcolor=#E9E9E9
| 65684 ||  || — || August 29, 1990 || Palomar || H. E. Holt || EUN || align=right | 5.9 km || 
|-id=685 bgcolor=#E9E9E9
| 65685 Behring ||  ||  || October 10, 1990 || Tautenburg Observatory || F. Börngen, L. D. Schmadel || NEM || align=right | 5.0 km || 
|-id=686 bgcolor=#d6d6d6
| 65686 ||  || — || October 14, 1990 || Kleť || A. Mrkos || — || align=right | 8.6 km || 
|-id=687 bgcolor=#fefefe
| 65687 ||  || — || November 12, 1990 || Kushiro || S. Ueda, H. Kaneda || — || align=right | 2.8 km || 
|-id=688 bgcolor=#E9E9E9
| 65688 ||  || — || November 13, 1990 || Palomar || C. S. Shoemaker || — || align=right | 6.5 km || 
|-id=689 bgcolor=#fefefe
| 65689 ||  || — || November 16, 1990 || La Silla || E. W. Elst || FLO || align=right | 1.8 km || 
|-id=690 bgcolor=#FFC2E0
| 65690 || 1991 DG || — || February 20, 1991 || Siding Spring || R. H. McNaught || APOPHA || align=right data-sort-value="0.54" | 540 m || 
|-id=691 bgcolor=#E9E9E9
| 65691 ||  || — || August 7, 1991 || Palomar || H. E. Holt || — || align=right | 5.2 km || 
|-id=692 bgcolor=#E9E9E9
| 65692 Trifu ||  ||  || September 12, 1991 || Tautenburg Observatory || L. D. Schmadel, F. Börngen || — || align=right | 4.7 km || 
|-id=693 bgcolor=#d6d6d6
| 65693 ||  || — || September 4, 1991 || La Silla || E. W. Elst || ALA || align=right | 15 km || 
|-id=694 bgcolor=#fefefe
| 65694 Franzrosenzweig ||  ||  || September 10, 1991 || Tautenburg Observatory || F. Börngen || — || align=right | 3.8 km || 
|-id=695 bgcolor=#fefefe
| 65695 ||  || — || September 29, 1991 || Kitt Peak || Spacewatch || V || align=right | 1.5 km || 
|-id=696 bgcolor=#E9E9E9
| 65696 Pierrehenry ||  ||  || October 6, 1991 || Palomar || A. Lowe || — || align=right | 4.8 km || 
|-id=697 bgcolor=#E9E9E9
| 65697 Paulandrew ||  ||  || October 6, 1991 || Palomar || A. Lowe || — || align=right | 2.9 km || 
|-id=698 bgcolor=#E9E9E9
| 65698 Emmarochelle ||  ||  || October 6, 1991 || Palomar || A. Lowe || — || align=right | 1.8 km || 
|-id=699 bgcolor=#E9E9E9
| 65699 ||  || — || November 2, 1991 || La Silla || E. W. Elst || — || align=right | 2.8 km || 
|-id=700 bgcolor=#fefefe
| 65700 ||  || — || November 9, 1991 || La Silla || E. W. Elst || — || align=right | 6.2 km || 
|}

65701–65800 

|-bgcolor=#d6d6d6
| 65701 ||  || — || January 30, 1992 || La Silla || E. W. Elst || — || align=right | 5.1 km || 
|-id=702 bgcolor=#fefefe
| 65702 ||  || — || March 1, 1992 || La Silla || UESAC || — || align=right | 1.4 km || 
|-id=703 bgcolor=#d6d6d6
| 65703 ||  || — || March 1, 1992 || La Silla || UESAC || VER || align=right | 6.4 km || 
|-id=704 bgcolor=#d6d6d6
| 65704 ||  || — || March 1, 1992 || La Silla || UESAC || — || align=right | 6.2 km || 
|-id=705 bgcolor=#E9E9E9
| 65705 ||  || — || April 4, 1992 || La Silla || E. W. Elst || — || align=right | 4.5 km || 
|-id=706 bgcolor=#FFC2E0
| 65706 || 1992 NA || — || July 1, 1992 || Siding Spring || R. H. McNaught || AMO +1km || align=right | 1.8 km || 
|-id=707 bgcolor=#fefefe
| 65707 ||  || — || August 8, 1992 || Caussols || E. W. Elst || V || align=right | 2.1 km || 
|-id=708 bgcolor=#fefefe
| 65708 Ehrlich ||  ||  || September 4, 1992 || Tautenburg Observatory || F. Börngen, L. D. Schmadel || NYS || align=right | 4.6 km || 
|-id=709 bgcolor=#d6d6d6
| 65709 ||  || — || September 2, 1992 || La Silla || E. W. Elst || — || align=right | 6.6 km || 
|-id=710 bgcolor=#fefefe
| 65710 ||  || — || September 2, 1992 || La Silla || E. W. Elst || NYS || align=right | 1.7 km || 
|-id=711 bgcolor=#fefefe
| 65711 ||  || — || September 2, 1992 || La Silla || E. W. Elst || NYS || align=right | 1.6 km || 
|-id=712 bgcolor=#d6d6d6
| 65712 Schneidmüller ||  ||  || September 24, 1992 || Tautenburg Observatory || L. D. Schmadel, F. Börngen || LIX || align=right | 9.6 km || 
|-id=713 bgcolor=#fefefe
| 65713 ||  || — || October 19, 1992 || Kushiro || S. Ueda, H. Kaneda || — || align=right | 4.3 km || 
|-id=714 bgcolor=#fefefe
| 65714 || 1992 VR || — || November 2, 1992 || Kushiro || S. Ueda, H. Kaneda || — || align=right | 6.2 km || 
|-id=715 bgcolor=#fefefe
| 65715 ||  || — || November 16, 1992 || Kushiro || S. Ueda, H. Kaneda || — || align=right | 2.6 km || 
|-id=716 bgcolor=#fefefe
| 65716 Ohkinohama ||  ||  || January 25, 1993 || Geisei || T. Seki || — || align=right | 2.6 km || 
|-id=717 bgcolor=#FFC2E0
| 65717 ||  || — || January 31, 1993 || Siding Spring || R. H. McNaught || APOPHA || align=right data-sort-value="0.25" | 250 m || 
|-id=718 bgcolor=#fefefe
| 65718 || 1993 FL || — || March 23, 1993 || Lake Tekapo || A. C. Gilmore, P. M. Kilmartin || — || align=right | 1.5 km || 
|-id=719 bgcolor=#fefefe
| 65719 ||  || — || March 17, 1993 || La Silla || UESAC || V || align=right | 1.5 km || 
|-id=720 bgcolor=#fefefe
| 65720 ||  || — || March 17, 1993 || La Silla || UESAC || FLO || align=right | 1.5 km || 
|-id=721 bgcolor=#fefefe
| 65721 ||  || — || March 21, 1993 || La Silla || UESAC || — || align=right | 1.4 km || 
|-id=722 bgcolor=#E9E9E9
| 65722 ||  || — || March 19, 1993 || La Silla || UESAC || EUN || align=right | 5.3 km || 
|-id=723 bgcolor=#fefefe
| 65723 ||  || — || March 19, 1993 || La Silla || UESAC || — || align=right | 1.6 km || 
|-id=724 bgcolor=#d6d6d6
| 65724 ||  || — || March 19, 1993 || La Silla || UESAC || — || align=right | 5.0 km || 
|-id=725 bgcolor=#E9E9E9
| 65725 ||  || — || March 17, 1993 || La Silla || UESAC || RAF || align=right | 2.3 km || 
|-id=726 bgcolor=#d6d6d6
| 65726 ||  || — || March 19, 1993 || La Silla || UESAC || URS || align=right | 6.7 km || 
|-id=727 bgcolor=#d6d6d6
| 65727 ||  || — || March 21, 1993 || La Silla || UESAC || 7:4 || align=right | 7.5 km || 
|-id=728 bgcolor=#E9E9E9
| 65728 ||  || — || March 26, 1993 || Kitt Peak || Spacewatch || MAR || align=right | 2.0 km || 
|-id=729 bgcolor=#E9E9E9
| 65729 || 1993 JQ || — || May 14, 1993 || La Silla || E. W. Elst || CLO || align=right | 5.0 km || 
|-id=730 bgcolor=#E9E9E9
| 65730 ||  || — || June 14, 1993 || Siding Spring || R. H. McNaught || — || align=right | 5.0 km || 
|-id=731 bgcolor=#fefefe
| 65731 ||  || — || July 20, 1993 || La Silla || E. W. Elst || — || align=right | 2.1 km || 
|-id=732 bgcolor=#d6d6d6
| 65732 ||  || — || July 20, 1993 || La Silla || E. W. Elst || BRA || align=right | 3.4 km || 
|-id=733 bgcolor=#FFC2E0
| 65733 || 1993 PC || — || August 15, 1993 || Kitt Peak || Spacewatch || APO || align=right data-sort-value="0.75" | 750 m || 
|-id=734 bgcolor=#d6d6d6
| 65734 ||  || — || August 15, 1993 || Caussols || E. W. Elst || EOS || align=right | 5.7 km || 
|-id=735 bgcolor=#d6d6d6
| 65735 ||  || — || August 18, 1993 || Caussols || E. W. Elst || — || align=right | 5.5 km || 
|-id=736 bgcolor=#fefefe
| 65736 ||  || — || August 20, 1993 || La Silla || E. W. Elst || — || align=right | 1.8 km || 
|-id=737 bgcolor=#fefefe
| 65737 ||  || — || September 15, 1993 || La Silla || E. W. Elst || — || align=right | 1.5 km || 
|-id=738 bgcolor=#fefefe
| 65738 ||  || — || September 14, 1993 || La Silla || H. Debehogne, E. W. Elst || — || align=right | 1.3 km || 
|-id=739 bgcolor=#d6d6d6
| 65739 ||  || — || September 16, 1993 || La Silla || H. Debehogne, E. W. Elst || EOS || align=right | 4.5 km || 
|-id=740 bgcolor=#d6d6d6
| 65740 ||  || — || October 15, 1993 || Kitt Peak || Spacewatch || — || align=right | 5.5 km || 
|-id=741 bgcolor=#fefefe
| 65741 ||  || — || October 9, 1993 || La Silla || E. W. Elst || — || align=right | 1.1 km || 
|-id=742 bgcolor=#FA8072
| 65742 ||  || — || October 9, 1993 || La Silla || E. W. Elst || — || align=right | 1.4 km || 
|-id=743 bgcolor=#fefefe
| 65743 ||  || — || October 9, 1993 || La Silla || E. W. Elst || FLO || align=right | 1.5 km || 
|-id=744 bgcolor=#fefefe
| 65744 ||  || — || October 9, 1993 || La Silla || E. W. Elst || V || align=right | 3.8 km || 
|-id=745 bgcolor=#fefefe
| 65745 ||  || — || October 9, 1993 || La Silla || E. W. Elst || — || align=right | 1.4 km || 
|-id=746 bgcolor=#d6d6d6
| 65746 ||  || — || October 9, 1993 || La Silla || E. W. Elst || THM || align=right | 6.6 km || 
|-id=747 bgcolor=#E9E9E9
| 65747 ||  || — || October 9, 1993 || La Silla || E. W. Elst || — || align=right | 5.1 km || 
|-id=748 bgcolor=#fefefe
| 65748 ||  || — || October 9, 1993 || La Silla || E. W. Elst || — || align=right | 2.7 km || 
|-id=749 bgcolor=#fefefe
| 65749 ||  || — || October 9, 1993 || La Silla || E. W. Elst || FLO || align=right | 1.6 km || 
|-id=750 bgcolor=#fefefe
| 65750 ||  || — || October 20, 1993 || Siding Spring || R. H. McNaught || H || align=right | 1.2 km || 
|-id=751 bgcolor=#fefefe
| 65751 ||  || — || January 19, 1994 || Kitt Peak || Spacewatch || — || align=right | 1.7 km || 
|-id=752 bgcolor=#fefefe
| 65752 ||  || — || February 7, 1994 || La Silla || E. W. Elst || — || align=right | 2.8 km || 
|-id=753 bgcolor=#E9E9E9
| 65753 ||  || — || February 8, 1994 || La Silla || E. W. Elst || — || align=right | 1.8 km || 
|-id=754 bgcolor=#fefefe
| 65754 ||  || — || February 8, 1994 || La Silla || E. W. Elst || — || align=right | 2.5 km || 
|-id=755 bgcolor=#fefefe
| 65755 ||  || — || March 8, 1994 || Farra d'Isonzo || Farra d'Isonzo || FLO || align=right | 1.8 km || 
|-id=756 bgcolor=#fefefe
| 65756 ||  || — || March 5, 1994 || Kitt Peak || Spacewatch || — || align=right | 1.9 km || 
|-id=757 bgcolor=#FA8072
| 65757 || 1994 FV || — || March 21, 1994 || Siding Spring || G. J. Garradd || H || align=right | 2.0 km || 
|-id=758 bgcolor=#E9E9E9
| 65758 ||  || — || August 10, 1994 || La Silla || E. W. Elst || GEF || align=right | 2.5 km || 
|-id=759 bgcolor=#E9E9E9
| 65759 ||  || — || August 10, 1994 || La Silla || E. W. Elst || — || align=right | 4.2 km || 
|-id=760 bgcolor=#E9E9E9
| 65760 ||  || — || August 12, 1994 || La Silla || E. W. Elst || GEF || align=right | 2.6 km || 
|-id=761 bgcolor=#E9E9E9
| 65761 || 1994 RA || — || September 1, 1994 || Farra d'Isonzo || Farra d'Isonzo || — || align=right | 4.9 km || 
|-id=762 bgcolor=#E9E9E9
| 65762 || 1994 RG || — || September 4, 1994 || Stroncone || Santa Lucia Obs. || — || align=right | 3.8 km || 
|-id=763 bgcolor=#fefefe
| 65763 ||  || — || September 12, 1994 || Kitt Peak || Spacewatch || NYS || align=right | 1.5 km || 
|-id=764 bgcolor=#E9E9E9
| 65764 ||  || — || October 13, 1994 || Kiyosato || S. Otomo || — || align=right | 6.0 km || 
|-id=765 bgcolor=#fefefe
| 65765 ||  || — || October 25, 1994 || Kushiro || S. Ueda, H. Kaneda || NYS || align=right | 2.5 km || 
|-id=766 bgcolor=#E9E9E9
| 65766 ||  || — || November 27, 1994 || Oizumi || T. Kobayashi || GEF || align=right | 4.0 km || 
|-id=767 bgcolor=#fefefe
| 65767 ||  || — || January 29, 1995 || Kitt Peak || Spacewatch || FLO || align=right | 1.5 km || 
|-id=768 bgcolor=#d6d6d6
| 65768 ||  || — || February 24, 1995 || Kitt Peak || Spacewatch || THM || align=right | 7.2 km || 
|-id=769 bgcolor=#d6d6d6
| 65769 Mahalia ||  ||  || March 4, 1995 || Tautenburg Observatory || F. Börngen || — || align=right | 12 km || 
|-id=770 bgcolor=#E9E9E9
| 65770 Leonardotestoni ||  ||  || May 28, 1995 || Bologna || San Vittore Obs. || — || align=right | 3.3 km || 
|-id=771 bgcolor=#fefefe
| 65771 ||  || — || May 25, 1995 || Kitt Peak || Spacewatch || V || align=right | 1.4 km || 
|-id=772 bgcolor=#E9E9E9
| 65772 ||  || — || June 22, 1995 || Kitt Peak || Spacewatch || — || align=right | 3.4 km || 
|-id=773 bgcolor=#d6d6d6
| 65773 ||  || — || July 22, 1995 || Kitt Peak || Spacewatch || EOS || align=right | 3.7 km || 
|-id=774 bgcolor=#d6d6d6
| 65774 ||  || — || July 22, 1995 || Kitt Peak || Spacewatch || — || align=right | 3.9 km || 
|-id=775 bgcolor=#E9E9E9
| 65775 Reikotosa ||  ||  || September 18, 1995 || Kuma Kogen || A. Nakamura || — || align=right | 2.0 km || 
|-id=776 bgcolor=#FA8072
| 65776 ||  || — || September 20, 1995 || Kitami || K. Endate, K. Watanabe || — || align=right | 2.3 km || 
|-id=777 bgcolor=#E9E9E9
| 65777 ||  || — || September 19, 1995 || Kitt Peak || Spacewatch || — || align=right | 2.0 km || 
|-id=778 bgcolor=#E9E9E9
| 65778 ||  || — || September 21, 1995 || Kitt Peak || Spacewatch || — || align=right | 1.7 km || 
|-id=779 bgcolor=#fefefe
| 65779 ||  || — || September 26, 1995 || Kitt Peak || Spacewatch || NYS || align=right | 1.5 km || 
|-id=780 bgcolor=#E9E9E9
| 65780 ||  || — || October 14, 1995 || Xinglong || SCAP || — || align=right | 3.2 km || 
|-id=781 bgcolor=#fefefe
| 65781 ||  || — || October 14, 1995 || Xinglong || SCAP || FLO || align=right | 2.2 km || 
|-id=782 bgcolor=#E9E9E9
| 65782 || 1995 UG || — || October 16, 1995 || Nachi-Katsuura || Y. Shimizu, T. Urata || — || align=right | 3.3 km || 
|-id=783 bgcolor=#E9E9E9
| 65783 || 1995 UK || — || October 17, 1995 || Yatsuka || H. Abe || — || align=right | 1.6 km || 
|-id=784 bgcolor=#FA8072
| 65784 Naderayama ||  ||  || October 20, 1995 || Nanyo || T. Okuni || — || align=right | 1.8 km || 
|-id=785 bgcolor=#E9E9E9
| 65785 Carlafracci ||  ||  || October 26, 1995 || Colleverde || V. S. Casulli || WIT || align=right | 2.3 km || 
|-id=786 bgcolor=#E9E9E9
| 65786 ||  || — || October 28, 1995 || Kitami || K. Endate, K. Watanabe || — || align=right | 4.2 km || 
|-id=787 bgcolor=#fefefe
| 65787 ||  || — || October 17, 1995 || Kitt Peak || Spacewatch || NYS || align=right | 1.6 km || 
|-id=788 bgcolor=#E9E9E9
| 65788 ||  || — || October 19, 1995 || Kitt Peak || Spacewatch || — || align=right | 2.0 km || 
|-id=789 bgcolor=#E9E9E9
| 65789 ||  || — || October 19, 1995 || Kitt Peak || Spacewatch || — || align=right | 2.1 km || 
|-id=790 bgcolor=#E9E9E9
| 65790 ||  || — || October 20, 1995 || Kitt Peak || Spacewatch || — || align=right | 2.0 km || 
|-id=791 bgcolor=#E9E9E9
| 65791 ||  || — || October 28, 1995 || Kitami || K. Endate, K. Watanabe || — || align=right | 7.9 km || 
|-id=792 bgcolor=#E9E9E9
| 65792 ||  || — || November 18, 1995 || Oizumi || T. Kobayashi || — || align=right | 2.6 km || 
|-id=793 bgcolor=#E9E9E9
| 65793 ||  || — || November 21, 1995 || Kleť || Kleť Obs. || — || align=right | 2.4 km || 
|-id=794 bgcolor=#E9E9E9
| 65794 ||  || — || November 18, 1995 || Kitt Peak || Spacewatch || — || align=right | 5.3 km || 
|-id=795 bgcolor=#d6d6d6
| 65795 ||  || — || November 19, 1995 || Kitt Peak || Spacewatch || THM || align=right | 3.4 km || 
|-id=796 bgcolor=#E9E9E9
| 65796 ||  || — || December 15, 1995 || Oizumi || T. Kobayashi || EUN || align=right | 4.4 km || 
|-id=797 bgcolor=#E9E9E9
| 65797 || 1995 YL || — || December 19, 1995 || Oizumi || T. Kobayashi || DOR || align=right | 7.1 km || 
|-id=798 bgcolor=#fefefe
| 65798 ||  || — || December 16, 1995 || Kitt Peak || Spacewatch || NYS || align=right | 1.7 km || 
|-id=799 bgcolor=#E9E9E9
| 65799 ||  || — || December 18, 1995 || Kitt Peak || Spacewatch || — || align=right | 6.2 km || 
|-id=800 bgcolor=#fefefe
| 65800 ||  || — || December 19, 1995 || Kitt Peak || Spacewatch || V || align=right | 1.6 km || 
|}

65801–65900 

|-bgcolor=#d6d6d6
| 65801 ||  || — || January 12, 1996 || Kitt Peak || Spacewatch || KAR || align=right | 2.2 km || 
|-id=802 bgcolor=#E9E9E9
| 65802 ||  || — || January 27, 1996 || Oizumi || T. Kobayashi || GEF || align=right | 3.3 km || 
|-id=803 bgcolor=#FFC2E0
| 65803 Didymos || 1996 GT ||  || April 11, 1996 || Kitt Peak || Spacewatch || APO +1kmPHAmoon || align=right data-sort-value="0.78" | 780 m || 
|-id=804 bgcolor=#d6d6d6
| 65804 ||  || — || April 18, 1996 || Kitt Peak || Spacewatch || — || align=right | 3.7 km || 
|-id=805 bgcolor=#E9E9E9
| 65805 ||  || — || April 17, 1996 || La Silla || E. W. Elst || — || align=right | 3.9 km || 
|-id=806 bgcolor=#fefefe
| 65806 ||  || — || April 18, 1996 || La Silla || E. W. Elst || NYS || align=right | 2.0 km || 
|-id=807 bgcolor=#E9E9E9
| 65807 ||  || — || May 13, 1996 || Kitt Peak || Spacewatch || — || align=right | 4.3 km || 
|-id=808 bgcolor=#FA8072
| 65808 ||  || — || June 14, 1996 || Haleakala || NEAT || — || align=right | 1.6 km || 
|-id=809 bgcolor=#fefefe
| 65809 ||  || — || September 13, 1996 || Kitt Peak || Spacewatch || V || align=right | 1.0 km || 
|-id=810 bgcolor=#fefefe
| 65810 ||  || — || September 5, 1996 || Bergisch Gladbach || W. Bickel || — || align=right | 1.3 km || 
|-id=811 bgcolor=#C2FFFF
| 65811 ||  || — || September 13, 1996 || La Silla || UDTS || L4 || align=right | 13 km || 
|-id=812 bgcolor=#d6d6d6
| 65812 ||  || — || September 30, 1996 || Stroncone || A. Vagnozzi || THM || align=right | 5.3 km || 
|-id=813 bgcolor=#fefefe
| 65813 ||  || — || October 7, 1996 || Catalina Station || T. B. Spahr || — || align=right | 2.4 km || 
|-id=814 bgcolor=#E9E9E9
| 65814 ||  || — || October 9, 1996 || Haleakala || NEAT || HNS || align=right | 3.3 km || 
|-id=815 bgcolor=#fefefe
| 65815 ||  || — || October 4, 1996 || Kitt Peak || Spacewatch || — || align=right | 3.6 km || 
|-id=816 bgcolor=#fefefe
| 65816 ||  || — || October 7, 1996 || Kitt Peak || Spacewatch || V || align=right | 1.3 km || 
|-id=817 bgcolor=#FA8072
| 65817 ||  || — || October 10, 1996 || Kitt Peak || Spacewatch || — || align=right | 1.8 km || 
|-id=818 bgcolor=#fefefe
| 65818 ||  || — || October 8, 1996 || La Silla || E. W. Elst || NYS || align=right | 1.7 km || 
|-id=819 bgcolor=#d6d6d6
| 65819 ||  || — || October 8, 1996 || La Silla || E. W. Elst || — || align=right | 5.9 km || 
|-id=820 bgcolor=#fefefe
| 65820 ||  || — || October 8, 1996 || La Silla || E. W. Elst || NYS || align=right | 1.3 km || 
|-id=821 bgcolor=#d6d6d6
| 65821 De Curtis ||  ||  || October 30, 1996 || Colleverde || V. S. Casulli || 3:2 || align=right | 13 km || 
|-id=822 bgcolor=#fefefe
| 65822 ||  || — || November 14, 1996 || Oohira || T. Urata || NYS || align=right | 3.1 km || 
|-id=823 bgcolor=#fefefe
| 65823 ||  || — || November 4, 1996 || Kitt Peak || Spacewatch || — || align=right | 2.3 km || 
|-id=824 bgcolor=#fefefe
| 65824 ||  || — || November 4, 1996 || Kitt Peak || Spacewatch || — || align=right | 2.2 km || 
|-id=825 bgcolor=#d6d6d6
| 65825 ||  || — || November 7, 1996 || Kitt Peak || Spacewatch || VER || align=right | 4.7 km || 
|-id=826 bgcolor=#d6d6d6
| 65826 ||  || — || November 11, 1996 || Kitt Peak || Spacewatch || — || align=right | 6.4 km || 
|-id=827 bgcolor=#d6d6d6
| 65827 ||  || — || November 4, 1996 || Kitt Peak || Spacewatch || — || align=right | 7.9 km || 
|-id=828 bgcolor=#d6d6d6
| 65828 ||  || — || November 1, 1996 || Xinglong || SCAP || — || align=right | 7.9 km || 
|-id=829 bgcolor=#fefefe
| 65829 ||  || — || November 26, 1996 || Xinglong || SCAP || — || align=right | 1.6 km || 
|-id=830 bgcolor=#E9E9E9
| 65830 || 1996 XA || — || December 1, 1996 || Prescott || P. G. Comba || — || align=right | 2.3 km || 
|-id=831 bgcolor=#fefefe
| 65831 ||  || — || December 6, 1996 || Kitt Peak || Spacewatch || V || align=right | 1.6 km || 
|-id=832 bgcolor=#fefefe
| 65832 ||  || — || December 7, 1996 || Oizumi || T. Kobayashi || NYS || align=right | 2.5 km || 
|-id=833 bgcolor=#E9E9E9
| 65833 ||  || — || December 7, 1996 || Oizumi || T. Kobayashi || EUN || align=right | 4.6 km || 
|-id=834 bgcolor=#fefefe
| 65834 ||  || — || December 1, 1996 || Kitt Peak || Spacewatch || NYS || align=right | 2.6 km || 
|-id=835 bgcolor=#fefefe
| 65835 ||  || — || December 2, 1996 || Kitt Peak || Spacewatch || — || align=right | 1.8 km || 
|-id=836 bgcolor=#fefefe
| 65836 ||  || — || December 10, 1996 || Xinglong || SCAP || H || align=right | 1.4 km || 
|-id=837 bgcolor=#fefefe
| 65837 ||  || — || December 5, 1996 || Kitt Peak || Spacewatch || ERI || align=right | 4.9 km || 
|-id=838 bgcolor=#E9E9E9
| 65838 ||  || — || December 8, 1996 || Chichibu || N. Satō || — || align=right | 2.6 km || 
|-id=839 bgcolor=#fefefe
| 65839 ||  || — || December 12, 1996 || Kitt Peak || Spacewatch || NYS || align=right | 1.5 km || 
|-id=840 bgcolor=#fefefe
| 65840 ||  || — || January 6, 1997 || Oizumi || T. Kobayashi || — || align=right | 2.1 km || 
|-id=841 bgcolor=#E9E9E9
| 65841 ||  || — || January 2, 1997 || Kitt Peak || Spacewatch || — || align=right | 3.2 km || 
|-id=842 bgcolor=#E9E9E9
| 65842 ||  || — || January 4, 1997 || Xinglong || SCAP || BRG || align=right | 4.7 km || 
|-id=843 bgcolor=#E9E9E9
| 65843 ||  || — || January 12, 1997 || Haleakala || NEAT || — || align=right | 5.2 km || 
|-id=844 bgcolor=#fefefe
| 65844 ||  || — || January 12, 1997 || Haleakala || NEAT || H || align=right | 1.5 km || 
|-id=845 bgcolor=#E9E9E9
| 65845 ||  || — || January 14, 1997 || Campo Imperatore || A. Boattini, A. Di Paola || — || align=right | 6.5 km || 
|-id=846 bgcolor=#E9E9E9
| 65846 ||  || — || January 30, 1997 || Oizumi || T. Kobayashi || — || align=right | 4.6 km || 
|-id=847 bgcolor=#E9E9E9
| 65847 ||  || — || January 31, 1997 || Kitt Peak || Spacewatch || — || align=right | 3.0 km || 
|-id=848 bgcolor=#d6d6d6
| 65848 Enricomari ||  ||  || January 30, 1997 || Cima Ekar || M. Tombelli || — || align=right | 4.7 km || 
|-id=849 bgcolor=#fefefe
| 65849 ||  || — || February 1, 1997 || Kitt Peak || Spacewatch || — || align=right | 2.7 km || 
|-id=850 bgcolor=#E9E9E9
| 65850 ||  || — || February 7, 1997 || Xinglong || SCAP || — || align=right | 4.8 km || 
|-id=851 bgcolor=#E9E9E9
| 65851 ||  || — || March 4, 1997 || Modra || A. Galád, A. Pravda || AER || align=right | 2.8 km || 
|-id=852 bgcolor=#E9E9E9
| 65852 Alle ||  ||  || March 7, 1997 || Bologna || San Vittore Obs. || — || align=right | 3.1 km || 
|-id=853 bgcolor=#E9E9E9
| 65853 ||  || — || March 5, 1997 || Socorro || LINEAR || HNA || align=right | 5.5 km || 
|-id=854 bgcolor=#E9E9E9
| 65854 ||  || — || March 7, 1997 || Bergisch Gladbach || W. Bickel || — || align=right | 7.4 km || 
|-id=855 bgcolor=#d6d6d6
| 65855 ||  || — || April 8, 1997 || Kitt Peak || Spacewatch || — || align=right | 7.3 km || 
|-id=856 bgcolor=#E9E9E9
| 65856 ||  || — || April 3, 1997 || Socorro || LINEAR || EUN || align=right | 2.7 km || 
|-id=857 bgcolor=#fefefe
| 65857 ||  || — || April 3, 1997 || Socorro || LINEAR || V || align=right | 1.5 km || 
|-id=858 bgcolor=#E9E9E9
| 65858 ||  || — || April 6, 1997 || Socorro || LINEAR || — || align=right | 1.9 km || 
|-id=859 bgcolor=#d6d6d6
| 65859 Mädler ||  ||  || April 9, 1997 || La Silla || E. W. Elst || 3:2 || align=right | 14 km || 
|-id=860 bgcolor=#E9E9E9
| 65860 ||  || — || April 30, 1997 || Socorro || LINEAR || — || align=right | 6.3 km || 
|-id=861 bgcolor=#E9E9E9
| 65861 ||  || — || May 1, 1997 || Socorro || LINEAR || — || align=right | 2.3 km || 
|-id=862 bgcolor=#E9E9E9
| 65862 ||  || — || May 3, 1997 || La Silla || E. W. Elst || — || align=right | 4.3 km || 
|-id=863 bgcolor=#d6d6d6
| 65863 ||  || — || May 28, 1997 || Kitt Peak || Spacewatch || — || align=right | 4.3 km || 
|-id=864 bgcolor=#d6d6d6
| 65864 || 1997 OT || — || July 27, 1997 || Caussols || ODAS || — || align=right | 7.7 km || 
|-id=865 bgcolor=#fefefe
| 65865 ||  || — || July 31, 1997 || Kitt Peak || Spacewatch || — || align=right | 3.7 km || 
|-id=866 bgcolor=#d6d6d6
| 65866 ||  || — || August 10, 1997 || Rand || G. R. Viscome || EUP || align=right | 17 km || 
|-id=867 bgcolor=#E9E9E9
| 65867 ||  || — || August 25, 1997 || Reedy Creek || J. Broughton || — || align=right | 6.6 km || 
|-id=868 bgcolor=#d6d6d6
| 65868 ||  || — || September 8, 1997 || Prescott || P. G. Comba || — || align=right | 4.1 km || 
|-id=869 bgcolor=#E9E9E9
| 65869 ||  || — || September 30, 1997 || Nanyo || T. Okuni || — || align=right | 3.1 km || 
|-id=870 bgcolor=#fefefe
| 65870 ||  || — || October 30, 1997 || Haleakala || NEAT || PHO || align=right | 2.2 km || 
|-id=871 bgcolor=#d6d6d6
| 65871 ||  || — || October 28, 1997 || Xinglong || SCAP || LUT || align=right | 19 km || 
|-id=872 bgcolor=#E9E9E9
| 65872 ||  || — || November 1, 1997 || Xinglong || SCAP || ADE || align=right | 5.5 km || 
|-id=873 bgcolor=#fefefe
| 65873 ||  || — || November 24, 1997 || Kitt Peak || Spacewatch || — || align=right | 3.0 km || 
|-id=874 bgcolor=#E9E9E9
| 65874 ||  || — || November 24, 1997 || Nachi-Katsuura || Y. Shimizu, T. Urata || DOR || align=right | 7.2 km || 
|-id=875 bgcolor=#E9E9E9
| 65875 ||  || — || November 23, 1997 || Kitt Peak || Spacewatch || — || align=right | 3.5 km || 
|-id=876 bgcolor=#E9E9E9
| 65876 ||  || — || November 29, 1997 || Kitt Peak || Spacewatch || — || align=right | 3.3 km || 
|-id=877 bgcolor=#fefefe
| 65877 ||  || — || December 4, 1997 || Oizumi || T. Kobayashi || FLO || align=right | 2.7 km || 
|-id=878 bgcolor=#fefefe
| 65878 ||  || — || December 5, 1997 || Oizumi || T. Kobayashi || V || align=right | 2.0 km || 
|-id=879 bgcolor=#E9E9E9
| 65879 ||  || — || December 21, 1997 || Oizumi || T. Kobayashi || — || align=right | 5.0 km || 
|-id=880 bgcolor=#fefefe
| 65880 ||  || — || December 21, 1997 || Xinglong || SCAP || FLO || align=right | 3.9 km || 
|-id=881 bgcolor=#fefefe
| 65881 ||  || — || December 25, 1997 || Oizumi || T. Kobayashi || FLO || align=right | 2.6 km || 
|-id=882 bgcolor=#d6d6d6
| 65882 ||  || — || December 28, 1997 || Stroncone || Santa Lucia Obs. || EOS || align=right | 5.7 km || 
|-id=883 bgcolor=#E9E9E9
| 65883 ||  || — || December 31, 1997 || Oizumi || T. Kobayashi || HNS || align=right | 2.8 km || 
|-id=884 bgcolor=#fefefe
| 65884 ||  || — || December 29, 1997 || Kitt Peak || Spacewatch || NYS || align=right | 3.3 km || 
|-id=885 bgcolor=#fefefe
| 65885 Lubenow ||  ||  || December 27, 1997 || Anderson Mesa || M. W. Buie || — || align=right | 1.6 km || 
|-id=886 bgcolor=#fefefe
| 65886 || 1998 AM || — || January 5, 1998 || Oizumi || T. Kobayashi || FLO || align=right | 1.8 km || 
|-id=887 bgcolor=#fefefe
| 65887 ||  || — || January 5, 1998 || Xinglong || SCAP || NYS || align=right | 6.5 km || 
|-id=888 bgcolor=#E9E9E9
| 65888 ||  || — || January 18, 1998 || Kitt Peak || Spacewatch || AST || align=right | 3.9 km || 
|-id=889 bgcolor=#fefefe
| 65889 ||  || — || January 23, 1998 || Zeno || T. Stafford || ERI || align=right | 5.1 km || 
|-id=890 bgcolor=#fefefe
| 65890 ||  || — || January 26, 1998 || Kitt Peak || Spacewatch || NYS || align=right | 1.2 km || 
|-id=891 bgcolor=#fefefe
| 65891 ||  || — || January 28, 1998 || Oizumi || T. Kobayashi || — || align=right | 2.9 km || 
|-id=892 bgcolor=#E9E9E9
| 65892 ||  || — || January 28, 1998 || Bédoin || P. Antonini || — || align=right | 5.3 km || 
|-id=893 bgcolor=#fefefe
| 65893 ||  || — || January 31, 1998 || Oizumi || T. Kobayashi || — || align=right | 3.4 km || 
|-id=894 bgcolor=#fefefe
| 65894 Echizenmisaki ||  ||  || January 30, 1998 || Geisei || T. Seki || — || align=right | 3.0 km || 
|-id=895 bgcolor=#fefefe
| 65895 || 1998 CP || — || February 3, 1998 || Kleť || M. Tichý, Z. Moravec || NYS || align=right | 1.8 km || 
|-id=896 bgcolor=#fefefe
| 65896 ||  || — || February 1, 1998 || Xinglong || SCAP || V || align=right | 1.9 km || 
|-id=897 bgcolor=#fefefe
| 65897 ||  || — || February 22, 1998 || Haleakala || NEAT || — || align=right | 3.3 km || 
|-id=898 bgcolor=#E9E9E9
| 65898 ||  || — || February 22, 1998 || Haleakala || NEAT || — || align=right | 6.0 km || 
|-id=899 bgcolor=#fefefe
| 65899 ||  || — || February 23, 1998 || Kitt Peak || Spacewatch || — || align=right | 1.6 km || 
|-id=900 bgcolor=#fefefe
| 65900 ||  || — || February 23, 1998 || Haleakala || NEAT || — || align=right | 2.9 km || 
|}

65901–66000 

|-bgcolor=#fefefe
| 65901 ||  || — || February 22, 1998 || Kitt Peak || Spacewatch || — || align=right | 2.0 km || 
|-id=902 bgcolor=#fefefe
| 65902 ||  || — || February 23, 1998 || Kitt Peak || Spacewatch || — || align=right | 1.6 km || 
|-id=903 bgcolor=#fefefe
| 65903 ||  || — || February 23, 1998 || Kitt Peak || Spacewatch || MAS || align=right | 2.5 km || 
|-id=904 bgcolor=#fefefe
| 65904 ||  || — || February 26, 1998 || Reedy Creek || J. Broughton || — || align=right | 2.2 km || 
|-id=905 bgcolor=#E9E9E9
| 65905 ||  || — || March 2, 1998 || Caussols || ODAS || — || align=right | 2.6 km || 
|-id=906 bgcolor=#fefefe
| 65906 ||  || — || March 3, 1998 || Kitt Peak || Spacewatch || NYS || align=right | 2.3 km || 
|-id=907 bgcolor=#fefefe
| 65907 ||  || — || March 1, 1998 || La Silla || E. W. Elst || — || align=right | 4.8 km || 
|-id=908 bgcolor=#E9E9E9
| 65908 || 1998 FQ || — || March 18, 1998 || Kitt Peak || Spacewatch || — || align=right | 3.0 km || 
|-id=909 bgcolor=#FFC2E0
| 65909 ||  || — || March 25, 1998 || Socorro || LINEAR || APOPHA || align=right data-sort-value="0.51" | 510 m || 
|-id=910 bgcolor=#d6d6d6
| 65910 ||  || — || March 20, 1998 || Socorro || LINEAR || — || align=right | 6.7 km || 
|-id=911 bgcolor=#E9E9E9
| 65911 ||  || — || March 20, 1998 || Socorro || LINEAR || — || align=right | 2.4 km || 
|-id=912 bgcolor=#fefefe
| 65912 ||  || — || March 20, 1998 || Socorro || LINEAR || — || align=right | 5.3 km || 
|-id=913 bgcolor=#fefefe
| 65913 ||  || — || March 20, 1998 || Socorro || LINEAR || NYS || align=right | 2.1 km || 
|-id=914 bgcolor=#fefefe
| 65914 ||  || — || March 20, 1998 || Socorro || LINEAR || V || align=right | 2.0 km || 
|-id=915 bgcolor=#fefefe
| 65915 ||  || — || March 20, 1998 || Socorro || LINEAR || — || align=right | 5.6 km || 
|-id=916 bgcolor=#fefefe
| 65916 ||  || — || March 20, 1998 || Socorro || LINEAR || V || align=right | 2.0 km || 
|-id=917 bgcolor=#fefefe
| 65917 ||  || — || March 20, 1998 || Socorro || LINEAR || V || align=right | 1.5 km || 
|-id=918 bgcolor=#fefefe
| 65918 ||  || — || March 20, 1998 || Socorro || LINEAR || SUL || align=right | 4.2 km || 
|-id=919 bgcolor=#fefefe
| 65919 ||  || — || March 20, 1998 || Socorro || LINEAR || — || align=right | 1.9 km || 
|-id=920 bgcolor=#fefefe
| 65920 ||  || — || March 20, 1998 || Socorro || LINEAR || NYS || align=right | 1.7 km || 
|-id=921 bgcolor=#fefefe
| 65921 ||  || — || March 20, 1998 || Socorro || LINEAR || V || align=right | 1.6 km || 
|-id=922 bgcolor=#fefefe
| 65922 ||  || — || March 20, 1998 || Socorro || LINEAR || — || align=right | 1.7 km || 
|-id=923 bgcolor=#fefefe
| 65923 ||  || — || March 20, 1998 || Socorro || LINEAR || — || align=right | 1.7 km || 
|-id=924 bgcolor=#E9E9E9
| 65924 ||  || — || March 20, 1998 || Socorro || LINEAR || — || align=right | 2.2 km || 
|-id=925 bgcolor=#fefefe
| 65925 ||  || — || March 20, 1998 || Socorro || LINEAR || — || align=right | 2.4 km || 
|-id=926 bgcolor=#fefefe
| 65926 ||  || — || March 20, 1998 || Socorro || LINEAR || FLO || align=right | 2.7 km || 
|-id=927 bgcolor=#fefefe
| 65927 ||  || — || March 20, 1998 || Socorro || LINEAR || NYS || align=right | 1.7 km || 
|-id=928 bgcolor=#E9E9E9
| 65928 ||  || — || March 20, 1998 || Socorro || LINEAR || — || align=right | 5.0 km || 
|-id=929 bgcolor=#d6d6d6
| 65929 ||  || — || March 20, 1998 || Socorro || LINEAR || — || align=right | 5.7 km || 
|-id=930 bgcolor=#E9E9E9
| 65930 ||  || — || March 20, 1998 || Socorro || LINEAR || — || align=right | 3.2 km || 
|-id=931 bgcolor=#fefefe
| 65931 ||  || — || March 20, 1998 || Socorro || LINEAR || — || align=right | 2.5 km || 
|-id=932 bgcolor=#fefefe
| 65932 ||  || — || March 20, 1998 || Socorro || LINEAR || FLO || align=right | 1.5 km || 
|-id=933 bgcolor=#fefefe
| 65933 ||  || — || March 20, 1998 || Socorro || LINEAR || NYS || align=right | 1.9 km || 
|-id=934 bgcolor=#fefefe
| 65934 ||  || — || March 20, 1998 || Socorro || LINEAR || FLO || align=right | 2.6 km || 
|-id=935 bgcolor=#E9E9E9
| 65935 ||  || — || March 20, 1998 || Socorro || LINEAR || KON || align=right | 5.6 km || 
|-id=936 bgcolor=#E9E9E9
| 65936 ||  || — || March 20, 1998 || Socorro || LINEAR || — || align=right | 5.0 km || 
|-id=937 bgcolor=#E9E9E9
| 65937 ||  || — || March 26, 1998 || Caussols || ODAS || — || align=right | 3.1 km || 
|-id=938 bgcolor=#E9E9E9
| 65938 ||  || — || March 24, 1998 || Socorro || LINEAR || EUN || align=right | 4.1 km || 
|-id=939 bgcolor=#E9E9E9
| 65939 ||  || — || March 24, 1998 || Socorro || LINEAR || — || align=right | 5.4 km || 
|-id=940 bgcolor=#fefefe
| 65940 ||  || — || March 24, 1998 || Socorro || LINEAR || — || align=right | 1.9 km || 
|-id=941 bgcolor=#fefefe
| 65941 ||  || — || March 24, 1998 || Socorro || LINEAR || V || align=right | 2.1 km || 
|-id=942 bgcolor=#fefefe
| 65942 ||  || — || March 24, 1998 || Socorro || LINEAR || — || align=right | 2.5 km || 
|-id=943 bgcolor=#d6d6d6
| 65943 ||  || — || March 31, 1998 || Socorro || LINEAR || — || align=right | 6.2 km || 
|-id=944 bgcolor=#fefefe
| 65944 ||  || — || March 31, 1998 || Socorro || LINEAR || — || align=right | 3.9 km || 
|-id=945 bgcolor=#d6d6d6
| 65945 ||  || — || March 31, 1998 || Socorro || LINEAR || — || align=right | 6.0 km || 
|-id=946 bgcolor=#E9E9E9
| 65946 ||  || — || March 31, 1998 || Socorro || LINEAR || — || align=right | 4.2 km || 
|-id=947 bgcolor=#d6d6d6
| 65947 ||  || — || March 31, 1998 || Socorro || LINEAR || — || align=right | 5.6 km || 
|-id=948 bgcolor=#fefefe
| 65948 ||  || — || March 31, 1998 || Socorro || LINEAR || V || align=right | 1.8 km || 
|-id=949 bgcolor=#fefefe
| 65949 ||  || — || March 31, 1998 || Socorro || LINEAR || — || align=right | 2.8 km || 
|-id=950 bgcolor=#fefefe
| 65950 ||  || — || March 31, 1998 || Socorro || LINEAR || FLO || align=right | 2.7 km || 
|-id=951 bgcolor=#E9E9E9
| 65951 ||  || — || March 20, 1998 || Socorro || LINEAR || EUN || align=right | 3.5 km || 
|-id=952 bgcolor=#fefefe
| 65952 ||  || — || March 20, 1998 || Socorro || LINEAR || V || align=right | 1.8 km || 
|-id=953 bgcolor=#E9E9E9
| 65953 ||  || — || March 20, 1998 || Socorro || LINEAR || — || align=right | 4.7 km || 
|-id=954 bgcolor=#fefefe
| 65954 ||  || — || March 20, 1998 || Socorro || LINEAR || — || align=right | 2.5 km || 
|-id=955 bgcolor=#fefefe
| 65955 ||  || — || March 20, 1998 || Socorro || LINEAR || — || align=right | 1.9 km || 
|-id=956 bgcolor=#E9E9E9
| 65956 ||  || — || March 24, 1998 || Socorro || LINEAR || — || align=right | 2.4 km || 
|-id=957 bgcolor=#fefefe
| 65957 ||  || — || March 26, 1998 || Socorro || LINEAR || V || align=right | 3.2 km || 
|-id=958 bgcolor=#E9E9E9
| 65958 ||  || — || April 4, 1998 || Woomera || F. B. Zoltowski || — || align=right | 5.1 km || 
|-id=959 bgcolor=#E9E9E9
| 65959 ||  || — || April 2, 1998 || Socorro || LINEAR || — || align=right | 3.4 km || 
|-id=960 bgcolor=#E9E9E9
| 65960 ||  || — || April 2, 1998 || Socorro || LINEAR || — || align=right | 3.1 km || 
|-id=961 bgcolor=#E9E9E9
| 65961 ||  || — || April 18, 1998 || Kitt Peak || Spacewatch || ADE || align=right | 5.1 km || 
|-id=962 bgcolor=#fefefe
| 65962 ||  || — || April 18, 1998 || Kitt Peak || Spacewatch || NYS || align=right | 4.5 km || 
|-id=963 bgcolor=#E9E9E9
| 65963 ||  || — || April 22, 1998 || Kitt Peak || Spacewatch || — || align=right | 2.1 km || 
|-id=964 bgcolor=#E9E9E9
| 65964 ||  || — || April 21, 1998 || Caussols || ODAS || — || align=right | 3.3 km || 
|-id=965 bgcolor=#E9E9E9
| 65965 ||  || — || April 23, 1998 || Socorro || LINEAR || — || align=right | 6.7 km || 
|-id=966 bgcolor=#fefefe
| 65966 ||  || — || April 24, 1998 || Stroncone || Santa Lucia Obs. || — || align=right | 2.2 km || 
|-id=967 bgcolor=#d6d6d6
| 65967 ||  || — || April 17, 1998 || Kitt Peak || Spacewatch || — || align=right | 3.4 km || 
|-id=968 bgcolor=#fefefe
| 65968 ||  || — || April 18, 1998 || Socorro || LINEAR || V || align=right | 1.8 km || 
|-id=969 bgcolor=#E9E9E9
| 65969 ||  || — || April 18, 1998 || Socorro || LINEAR || — || align=right | 3.2 km || 
|-id=970 bgcolor=#fefefe
| 65970 ||  || — || April 20, 1998 || Socorro || LINEAR || — || align=right | 1.7 km || 
|-id=971 bgcolor=#d6d6d6
| 65971 ||  || — || April 21, 1998 || Kitt Peak || Spacewatch || — || align=right | 5.5 km || 
|-id=972 bgcolor=#fefefe
| 65972 ||  || — || April 23, 1998 || Kitt Peak || Spacewatch || ERI || align=right | 6.3 km || 
|-id=973 bgcolor=#E9E9E9
| 65973 ||  || — || April 20, 1998 || Socorro || LINEAR || — || align=right | 3.4 km || 
|-id=974 bgcolor=#E9E9E9
| 65974 ||  || — || April 20, 1998 || Socorro || LINEAR || — || align=right | 4.8 km || 
|-id=975 bgcolor=#E9E9E9
| 65975 ||  || — || April 20, 1998 || Socorro || LINEAR || — || align=right | 2.9 km || 
|-id=976 bgcolor=#fefefe
| 65976 ||  || — || April 25, 1998 || Anderson Mesa || LONEOS || — || align=right | 4.0 km || 
|-id=977 bgcolor=#E9E9E9
| 65977 ||  || — || April 21, 1998 || Socorro || LINEAR || — || align=right | 3.8 km || 
|-id=978 bgcolor=#E9E9E9
| 65978 ||  || — || April 21, 1998 || Socorro || LINEAR || — || align=right | 3.9 km || 
|-id=979 bgcolor=#E9E9E9
| 65979 ||  || — || April 23, 1998 || Socorro || LINEAR || — || align=right | 3.8 km || 
|-id=980 bgcolor=#d6d6d6
| 65980 ||  || — || April 23, 1998 || Socorro || LINEAR || EOS || align=right | 4.3 km || 
|-id=981 bgcolor=#E9E9E9
| 65981 ||  || — || April 23, 1998 || Socorro || LINEAR || JUN || align=right | 3.0 km || 
|-id=982 bgcolor=#E9E9E9
| 65982 ||  || — || April 23, 1998 || Socorro || LINEAR || — || align=right | 4.8 km || 
|-id=983 bgcolor=#fefefe
| 65983 ||  || — || April 23, 1998 || Socorro || LINEAR || — || align=right | 2.2 km || 
|-id=984 bgcolor=#E9E9E9
| 65984 ||  || — || April 23, 1998 || Socorro || LINEAR || — || align=right | 4.8 km || 
|-id=985 bgcolor=#E9E9E9
| 65985 ||  || — || April 23, 1998 || Socorro || LINEAR || — || align=right | 6.2 km || 
|-id=986 bgcolor=#E9E9E9
| 65986 ||  || — || April 23, 1998 || Socorro || LINEAR || — || align=right | 5.0 km || 
|-id=987 bgcolor=#E9E9E9
| 65987 ||  || — || April 21, 1998 || Socorro || LINEAR || — || align=right | 2.2 km || 
|-id=988 bgcolor=#E9E9E9
| 65988 ||  || — || May 18, 1998 || Anderson Mesa || LONEOS || — || align=right | 5.1 km || 
|-id=989 bgcolor=#d6d6d6
| 65989 ||  || — || May 22, 1998 || Socorro || LINEAR || 3:2 || align=right | 10 km || 
|-id=990 bgcolor=#E9E9E9
| 65990 ||  || — || May 22, 1998 || Socorro || LINEAR || — || align=right | 6.0 km || 
|-id=991 bgcolor=#E9E9E9
| 65991 ||  || — || May 22, 1998 || Socorro || LINEAR || DOR || align=right | 6.4 km || 
|-id=992 bgcolor=#E9E9E9
| 65992 ||  || — || May 23, 1998 || Socorro || LINEAR || — || align=right | 4.7 km || 
|-id=993 bgcolor=#E9E9E9
| 65993 ||  || — || May 23, 1998 || Socorro || LINEAR || — || align=right | 4.7 km || 
|-id=994 bgcolor=#E9E9E9
| 65994 ||  || — || May 23, 1998 || Socorro || LINEAR || — || align=right | 5.2 km || 
|-id=995 bgcolor=#E9E9E9
| 65995 ||  || — || May 23, 1998 || Socorro || LINEAR || — || align=right | 3.2 km || 
|-id=996 bgcolor=#FFC2E0
| 65996 ||  || — || June 24, 1998 || Socorro || LINEAR || AMO || align=right data-sort-value="0.74" | 740 m || 
|-id=997 bgcolor=#E9E9E9
| 65997 ||  || — || June 24, 1998 || Socorro || LINEAR || — || align=right | 4.5 km || 
|-id=998 bgcolor=#E9E9E9
| 65998 ||  || — || June 28, 1998 || La Silla || E. W. Elst || DOR || align=right | 6.5 km || 
|-id=999 bgcolor=#FA8072
| 65999 || 1998 ND || — || July 1, 1998 || Anderson Mesa || LONEOS || — || align=right | 2.4 km || 
|-id=000 bgcolor=#d6d6d6
| 66000 ||  || — || July 20, 1998 || San Marcello || A. Boattini, M. Tombelli || — || align=right | 6.1 km || 
|}

References

External links 
 Discovery Circumstances: Numbered Minor Planets (65001)–(70000) (IAU Minor Planet Center)

0065